

162001–162100 

|-bgcolor=#E9E9E9
| 162001 Vulpius ||  ||  || October 10, 1990 || Tautenburg Observatory || F. Börngen, L. D. Schmadel || — || align=right | 1.9 km || 
|-id=002 bgcolor=#E9E9E9
| 162002 Spalatin ||  ||  || October 10, 1990 || Tautenburg Observatory || F. Börngen, L. D. Schmadel || — || align=right | 1.7 km || 
|-id=003 bgcolor=#E9E9E9
| 162003 || 1991 TG || — || October 1, 1991 || Siding Spring || R. H. McNaught || — || align=right | 4.3 km || 
|-id=004 bgcolor=#FFC2E0
| 162004 || 1991 VE || — || November 3, 1991 || Palomar || E. F. Helin, K. J. Lawrence || ATE +1km || align=right data-sort-value="0.83" | 830 m || 
|-id=005 bgcolor=#fefefe
| 162005 ||  || — || September 27, 1992 || Kitt Peak || Spacewatch || MAS || align=right | 1.4 km || 
|-id=006 bgcolor=#d6d6d6
| 162006 ||  || — || March 19, 1993 || La Silla || UESAC || THM || align=right | 3.8 km || 
|-id=007 bgcolor=#E9E9E9
| 162007 ||  || — || March 19, 1993 || La Silla || UESAC || EUN || align=right | 2.4 km || 
|-id=008 bgcolor=#fefefe
| 162008 ||  || — || October 8, 1993 || Kitt Peak || Spacewatch || V || align=right data-sort-value="0.89" | 890 m || 
|-id=009 bgcolor=#fefefe
| 162009 ||  || — || October 9, 1993 || La Silla || E. W. Elst || FLO || align=right | 1.2 km || 
|-id=010 bgcolor=#fefefe
| 162010 ||  || — || October 20, 1993 || La Silla || E. W. Elst || — || align=right | 1.2 km || 
|-id=011 bgcolor=#FFC2E0
| 162011 Konnohmaru ||  ||  || January 4, 1994 || Yatsugatake || Y. Kushida, O. Muramatsu || AMO +1km || align=right | 1.7 km || 
|-id=012 bgcolor=#E9E9E9
| 162012 ||  || — || August 10, 1994 || La Silla || E. W. Elst || — || align=right | 2.2 km || 
|-id=013 bgcolor=#E9E9E9
| 162013 ||  || — || August 10, 1994 || La Silla || E. W. Elst || — || align=right | 2.6 km || 
|-id=014 bgcolor=#fefefe
| 162014 ||  || — || September 11, 1994 || Siding Spring || R. H. McNaught || H || align=right | 1.0 km || 
|-id=015 bgcolor=#FFC2E0
| 162015 ||  || — || October 5, 1994 || Siding Spring || R. H. McNaught || ATEcritical || align=right data-sort-value="0.51" | 510 m || 
|-id=016 bgcolor=#E9E9E9
| 162016 ||  || — || October 10, 1994 || Kitt Peak || Spacewatch || HEN || align=right | 1.6 km || 
|-id=017 bgcolor=#fefefe
| 162017 ||  || — || October 30, 1994 || Kitt Peak || Spacewatch || FLO || align=right data-sort-value="0.97" | 970 m || 
|-id=018 bgcolor=#fefefe
| 162018 ||  || — || January 29, 1995 || Kitt Peak || Spacewatch || — || align=right | 2.5 km || 
|-id=019 bgcolor=#fefefe
| 162019 ||  || — || February 21, 1995 || Kitt Peak || Spacewatch || — || align=right | 1.1 km || 
|-id=020 bgcolor=#d6d6d6
| 162020 ||  || — || February 24, 1995 || Kitt Peak || Spacewatch || — || align=right | 4.3 km || 
|-id=021 bgcolor=#d6d6d6
| 162021 ||  || — || March 27, 1995 || Kitt Peak || Spacewatch || — || align=right | 3.4 km || 
|-id=022 bgcolor=#d6d6d6
| 162022 ||  || — || March 27, 1995 || Kitt Peak || Spacewatch || — || align=right | 3.9 km || 
|-id=023 bgcolor=#fefefe
| 162023 ||  || — || April 8, 1995 || Kitt Peak || T. J. Balonek || — || align=right | 1.3 km || 
|-id=024 bgcolor=#E9E9E9
| 162024 ||  || — || September 18, 1995 || Kitt Peak || Spacewatch || — || align=right | 1.4 km || 
|-id=025 bgcolor=#E9E9E9
| 162025 ||  || — || September 19, 1995 || Kitt Peak || Spacewatch || — || align=right | 1.4 km || 
|-id=026 bgcolor=#E9E9E9
| 162026 ||  || — || September 22, 1995 || Kitt Peak || Spacewatch || — || align=right | 1.4 km || 
|-id=027 bgcolor=#E9E9E9
| 162027 ||  || — || October 17, 1995 || Kitt Peak || Spacewatch || — || align=right | 1.5 km || 
|-id=028 bgcolor=#E9E9E9
| 162028 ||  || — || October 23, 1995 || Kitt Peak || Spacewatch || — || align=right | 1.4 km || 
|-id=029 bgcolor=#E9E9E9
| 162029 ||  || — || October 22, 1995 || Kitt Peak || Spacewatch || — || align=right | 2.7 km || 
|-id=030 bgcolor=#E9E9E9
| 162030 ||  || — || November 15, 1995 || Kitt Peak || Spacewatch || — || align=right | 1.2 km || 
|-id=031 bgcolor=#E9E9E9
| 162031 ||  || — || November 15, 1995 || Kitt Peak || Spacewatch || — || align=right | 2.0 km || 
|-id=032 bgcolor=#E9E9E9
| 162032 ||  || — || November 20, 1995 || Haleakala || AMOS || — || align=right | 1.7 km || 
|-id=033 bgcolor=#d6d6d6
| 162033 ||  || — || November 22, 1995 || Kitt Peak || Spacewatch || — || align=right | 4.6 km || 
|-id=034 bgcolor=#E9E9E9
| 162034 ||  || — || December 15, 1995 || Oohira || T. Urata || — || align=right | 2.2 km || 
|-id=035 bgcolor=#E9E9E9
| 162035 Jirotakahashi ||  ||  || December 17, 1995 || Kuma Kogen || A. Nakamura || — || align=right | 2.4 km || 
|-id=036 bgcolor=#E9E9E9
| 162036 ||  || — || January 13, 1996 || Kitt Peak || Spacewatch || — || align=right | 1.7 km || 
|-id=037 bgcolor=#fefefe
| 162037 ||  || — || January 26, 1996 || Siding Spring || G. J. Garradd || FLO || align=right data-sort-value="0.77" | 770 m || 
|-id=038 bgcolor=#FFC2E0
| 162038 || 1996 DH || — || February 18, 1996 || Kitt Peak || Spacewatch || AMO +1km || align=right | 2.0 km || 
|-id=039 bgcolor=#FFC2E0
| 162039 || 1996 JG || — || May 8, 1996 || Siding Spring || R. H. McNaught || APOPHA || align=right data-sort-value="0.55" | 550 m || 
|-id=040 bgcolor=#fefefe
| 162040 ||  || — || May 22, 1996 || La Silla || E. W. Elst || V || align=right | 1.4 km || 
|-id=041 bgcolor=#fefefe
| 162041 ||  || — || July 14, 1996 || La Silla || E. W. Elst || — || align=right | 3.3 km || 
|-id=042 bgcolor=#d6d6d6
| 162042 || 1996 OR || — || July 22, 1996 || Prescott || P. G. Comba || — || align=right | 3.6 km || 
|-id=043 bgcolor=#d6d6d6
| 162043 ||  || — || August 8, 1996 || La Silla || E. W. Elst || — || align=right | 6.4 km || 
|-id=044 bgcolor=#d6d6d6
| 162044 ||  || — || September 13, 1996 || Haleakala || NEAT || EOS || align=right | 3.9 km || 
|-id=045 bgcolor=#fefefe
| 162045 ||  || — || September 13, 1996 || Kitt Peak || Spacewatch || — || align=right | 1.4 km || 
|-id=046 bgcolor=#C2FFFF
| 162046 ||  || — || September 13, 1996 || La Silla || UDTS || L4 || align=right | 13 km || 
|-id=047 bgcolor=#C2FFFF
| 162047 ||  || — || September 14, 1996 || La Silla || UDTS || L4 || align=right | 13 km || 
|-id=048 bgcolor=#C2FFFF
| 162048 ||  || — || September 14, 1996 || La Silla || UDTS || L4 || align=right | 9.9 km || 
|-id=049 bgcolor=#d6d6d6
| 162049 ||  || — || September 21, 1996 || Xinglong || SCAP || — || align=right | 6.3 km || 
|-id=050 bgcolor=#d6d6d6
| 162050 ||  || — || September 21, 1996 || Xinglong || SCAP || — || align=right | 5.2 km || 
|-id=051 bgcolor=#fefefe
| 162051 ||  || — || October 5, 1996 || Prescott || P. G. Comba || — || align=right | 2.0 km || 
|-id=052 bgcolor=#fefefe
| 162052 ||  || — || October 15, 1996 || Sudbury || D. di Cicco || NYS || align=right | 1.2 km || 
|-id=053 bgcolor=#d6d6d6
| 162053 ||  || — || October 7, 1996 || Kitt Peak || Spacewatch || — || align=right | 4.6 km || 
|-id=054 bgcolor=#fefefe
| 162054 ||  || — || October 8, 1996 || La Silla || E. W. Elst || NYS || align=right | 1.3 km || 
|-id=055 bgcolor=#fefefe
| 162055 ||  || — || November 10, 1996 || Needville || Needville Obs. || MAS || align=right | 1.1 km || 
|-id=056 bgcolor=#fefefe
| 162056 ||  || — || December 6, 1996 || Kitt Peak || Spacewatch || V || align=right | 1.2 km || 
|-id=057 bgcolor=#d6d6d6
| 162057 ||  || — || December 12, 1996 || Kitt Peak || Spacewatch || THM || align=right | 4.2 km || 
|-id=058 bgcolor=#FFC2E0
| 162058 ||  || — || January 10, 1997 || Kitt Peak || Spacewatch || AMO +1kmslow || align=right data-sort-value="0.85" | 850 m || 
|-id=059 bgcolor=#d6d6d6
| 162059 Mészáros ||  ||  || January 13, 1997 || Kleť || Kleť Obs. || — || align=right | 5.7 km || 
|-id=060 bgcolor=#E9E9E9
| 162060 ||  || — || February 2, 1997 || Kitt Peak || Spacewatch || RAF || align=right | 1.7 km || 
|-id=061 bgcolor=#E9E9E9
| 162061 ||  || — || February 13, 1997 || Prescott || P. G. Comba || — || align=right | 2.7 km || 
|-id=062 bgcolor=#E9E9E9
| 162062 ||  || — || March 5, 1997 || Kitt Peak || Spacewatch || — || align=right | 3.8 km || 
|-id=063 bgcolor=#FFC2E0
| 162063 ||  || — || March 7, 1997 || Kitt Peak || Spacewatch || APO || align=right data-sort-value="0.57" | 570 m || 
|-id=064 bgcolor=#E9E9E9
| 162064 ||  || — || April 7, 1997 || Kitt Peak || Spacewatch || — || align=right | 2.6 km || 
|-id=065 bgcolor=#fefefe
| 162065 ||  || — || May 30, 1997 || Kitt Peak || Spacewatch || — || align=right | 1.2 km || 
|-id=066 bgcolor=#d6d6d6
| 162066 ||  || — || June 29, 1997 || Kitt Peak || Spacewatch || — || align=right | 4.2 km || 
|-id=067 bgcolor=#d6d6d6
| 162067 ||  || — || July 3, 1997 || Kitt Peak || Spacewatch || — || align=right | 3.3 km || 
|-id=068 bgcolor=#d6d6d6
| 162068 ||  || — || September 29, 1997 || Kitt Peak || Spacewatch || — || align=right | 5.9 km || 
|-id=069 bgcolor=#d6d6d6
| 162069 ||  || — || October 3, 1997 || Caussols || ODAS || KOR || align=right | 2.3 km || 
|-id=070 bgcolor=#fefefe
| 162070 ||  || — || October 2, 1997 || Caussols || ODAS || — || align=right | 1.2 km || 
|-id=071 bgcolor=#d6d6d6
| 162071 ||  || — || October 4, 1997 || Kitt Peak || Spacewatch || — || align=right | 3.0 km || 
|-id=072 bgcolor=#fefefe
| 162072 ||  || — || October 6, 1997 || Kitami || K. Endate, K. Watanabe || — || align=right | 1.9 km || 
|-id=073 bgcolor=#fefefe
| 162073 ||  || — || October 28, 1997 || Kitt Peak || Spacewatch || FLO || align=right | 1.6 km || 
|-id=074 bgcolor=#d6d6d6
| 162074 ||  || — || November 5, 1997 || Ondřejov || P. Pravec || — || align=right | 5.9 km || 
|-id=075 bgcolor=#d6d6d6
| 162075 ||  || — || November 23, 1997 || Kitt Peak || Spacewatch || — || align=right | 4.8 km || 
|-id=076 bgcolor=#d6d6d6
| 162076 ||  || — || November 20, 1997 || Kitt Peak || Spacewatch || — || align=right | 4.0 km || 
|-id=077 bgcolor=#d6d6d6
| 162077 ||  || — || November 22, 1997 || Kitt Peak || Spacewatch || — || align=right | 3.8 km || 
|-id=078 bgcolor=#fefefe
| 162078 ||  || — || November 28, 1997 || Kitt Peak || Spacewatch || — || align=right | 1.3 km || 
|-id=079 bgcolor=#d6d6d6
| 162079 ||  || — || November 29, 1997 || Socorro || LINEAR || — || align=right | 5.7 km || 
|-id=080 bgcolor=#FFC2E0
| 162080 ||  || — || February 27, 1998 || Haleakala || NEAT || ATE || align=right data-sort-value="0.78" | 780 m || 
|-id=081 bgcolor=#fefefe
| 162081 ||  || — || March 20, 1998 || Socorro || LINEAR || NYS || align=right | 1.2 km || 
|-id=082 bgcolor=#FFC2E0
| 162082 ||  || — || April 18, 1998 || Socorro || LINEAR || APOPHA || align=right data-sort-value="0.53" | 530 m || 
|-id=083 bgcolor=#fefefe
| 162083 ||  || — || April 18, 1998 || Kitt Peak || Spacewatch || NYS || align=right | 1.2 km || 
|-id=084 bgcolor=#fefefe
| 162084 ||  || — || April 21, 1998 || Socorro || LINEAR || — || align=right | 3.5 km || 
|-id=085 bgcolor=#fefefe
| 162085 ||  || — || April 18, 1998 || Socorro || LINEAR || — || align=right | 1.8 km || 
|-id=086 bgcolor=#E9E9E9
| 162086 ||  || — || May 27, 1998 || Kitt Peak || Spacewatch || — || align=right | 2.5 km || 
|-id=087 bgcolor=#E9E9E9
| 162087 ||  || — || May 22, 1998 || Socorro || LINEAR || — || align=right | 1.9 km || 
|-id=088 bgcolor=#E9E9E9
| 162088 ||  || — || July 24, 1998 || Needville || Needville Obs. || — || align=right | 2.1 km || 
|-id=089 bgcolor=#E9E9E9
| 162089 ||  || — || July 26, 1998 || La Silla || E. W. Elst || MRX || align=right | 2.2 km || 
|-id=090 bgcolor=#E9E9E9
| 162090 || 1998 PP || — || August 15, 1998 || Prescott || P. G. Comba || EUN || align=right | 2.3 km || 
|-id=091 bgcolor=#E9E9E9
| 162091 ||  || — || August 17, 1998 || Socorro || LINEAR || — || align=right | 6.5 km || 
|-id=092 bgcolor=#E9E9E9
| 162092 ||  || — || August 17, 1998 || Reedy Creek || J. Broughton || — || align=right | 2.8 km || 
|-id=093 bgcolor=#E9E9E9
| 162093 ||  || — || August 17, 1998 || Socorro || LINEAR || — || align=right | 5.0 km || 
|-id=094 bgcolor=#E9E9E9
| 162094 ||  || — || August 17, 1998 || Socorro || LINEAR || — || align=right | 3.2 km || 
|-id=095 bgcolor=#E9E9E9
| 162095 ||  || — || August 25, 1998 || Ondřejov || L. Kotková || — || align=right | 3.4 km || 
|-id=096 bgcolor=#E9E9E9
| 162096 ||  || — || August 26, 1998 || Xinglong || SCAP || — || align=right | 4.2 km || 
|-id=097 bgcolor=#E9E9E9
| 162097 ||  || — || August 26, 1998 || Xinglong || SCAP || — || align=right | 3.3 km || 
|-id=098 bgcolor=#E9E9E9
| 162098 ||  || — || August 17, 1998 || Socorro || LINEAR || — || align=right | 4.2 km || 
|-id=099 bgcolor=#E9E9E9
| 162099 ||  || — || August 17, 1998 || Socorro || LINEAR || — || align=right | 4.5 km || 
|-id=100 bgcolor=#E9E9E9
| 162100 ||  || — || August 24, 1998 || Socorro || LINEAR || — || align=right | 3.8 km || 
|}

162101–162200 

|-bgcolor=#E9E9E9
| 162101 ||  || — || August 24, 1998 || Socorro || LINEAR || — || align=right | 3.4 km || 
|-id=102 bgcolor=#E9E9E9
| 162102 ||  || — || August 19, 1998 || Socorro || LINEAR || CLO || align=right | 4.6 km || 
|-id=103 bgcolor=#E9E9E9
| 162103 ||  || — || September 14, 1998 || Catalina || CSS || GEF || align=right | 1.9 km || 
|-id=104 bgcolor=#E9E9E9
| 162104 ||  || — || September 12, 1998 || Kitt Peak || Spacewatch || HEN || align=right | 1.6 km || 
|-id=105 bgcolor=#E9E9E9
| 162105 ||  || — || September 14, 1998 || Socorro || LINEAR || — || align=right | 3.9 km || 
|-id=106 bgcolor=#E9E9E9
| 162106 ||  || — || September 14, 1998 || Socorro || LINEAR || — || align=right | 5.4 km || 
|-id=107 bgcolor=#E9E9E9
| 162107 ||  || — || September 14, 1998 || Socorro || LINEAR || — || align=right | 4.3 km || 
|-id=108 bgcolor=#E9E9E9
| 162108 ||  || — || September 14, 1998 || Socorro || LINEAR || — || align=right | 3.4 km || 
|-id=109 bgcolor=#E9E9E9
| 162109 ||  || — || September 14, 1998 || Socorro || LINEAR || — || align=right | 3.8 km || 
|-id=110 bgcolor=#E9E9E9
| 162110 ||  || — || September 14, 1998 || Socorro || LINEAR || MAR || align=right | 2.2 km || 
|-id=111 bgcolor=#E9E9E9
| 162111 ||  || — || September 14, 1998 || Socorro || LINEAR || — || align=right | 5.7 km || 
|-id=112 bgcolor=#E9E9E9
| 162112 ||  || — || September 14, 1998 || Socorro || LINEAR || POS || align=right | 4.7 km || 
|-id=113 bgcolor=#E9E9E9
| 162113 ||  || — || September 14, 1998 || Socorro || LINEAR || — || align=right | 4.9 km || 
|-id=114 bgcolor=#E9E9E9
| 162114 ||  || — || September 17, 1998 || Xinglong || SCAP || — || align=right | 3.0 km || 
|-id=115 bgcolor=#E9E9E9
| 162115 ||  || — || September 19, 1998 || Reedy Creek || J. Broughton || — || align=right | 4.3 km || 
|-id=116 bgcolor=#FFC2E0
| 162116 ||  || — || September 21, 1998 || Socorro || LINEAR || APOPHA || align=right data-sort-value="0.54" | 540 m || 
|-id=117 bgcolor=#FFC2E0
| 162117 ||  || — || September 23, 1998 || Socorro || LINEAR || ATE || align=right data-sort-value="0.56" | 560 m || 
|-id=118 bgcolor=#E9E9E9
| 162118 ||  || — || September 20, 1998 || Kitt Peak || Spacewatch || — || align=right | 3.4 km || 
|-id=119 bgcolor=#E9E9E9
| 162119 ||  || — || September 26, 1998 || Socorro || LINEAR || TIN || align=right | 5.1 km || 
|-id=120 bgcolor=#FFC2E0
| 162120 ||  || — || September 27, 1998 || Socorro || LINEAR || APOPHA || align=right data-sort-value="0.28" | 280 m || 
|-id=121 bgcolor=#E9E9E9
| 162121 ||  || — || September 17, 1998 || Anderson Mesa || LONEOS || — || align=right | 2.7 km || 
|-id=122 bgcolor=#E9E9E9
| 162122 ||  || — || September 26, 1998 || Xinglong || SCAP || GEF || align=right | 2.4 km || 
|-id=123 bgcolor=#E9E9E9
| 162123 ||  || — || September 19, 1998 || Socorro || LINEAR || ADE || align=right | 3.6 km || 
|-id=124 bgcolor=#E9E9E9
| 162124 ||  || — || September 19, 1998 || Socorro || LINEAR || — || align=right | 4.4 km || 
|-id=125 bgcolor=#E9E9E9
| 162125 ||  || — || September 26, 1998 || Socorro || LINEAR || XIZ || align=right | 2.7 km || 
|-id=126 bgcolor=#E9E9E9
| 162126 ||  || — || September 26, 1998 || Socorro || LINEAR || — || align=right | 4.0 km || 
|-id=127 bgcolor=#E9E9E9
| 162127 ||  || — || September 26, 1998 || Socorro || LINEAR || JUN || align=right | 2.3 km || 
|-id=128 bgcolor=#E9E9E9
| 162128 ||  || — || September 26, 1998 || Socorro || LINEAR || MRX || align=right | 2.1 km || 
|-id=129 bgcolor=#E9E9E9
| 162129 ||  || — || September 26, 1998 || Socorro || LINEAR || PAE || align=right | 5.0 km || 
|-id=130 bgcolor=#E9E9E9
| 162130 ||  || — || September 26, 1998 || Socorro || LINEAR || — || align=right | 2.7 km || 
|-id=131 bgcolor=#E9E9E9
| 162131 ||  || — || September 26, 1998 || Socorro || LINEAR || — || align=right | 4.9 km || 
|-id=132 bgcolor=#E9E9E9
| 162132 ||  || — || September 26, 1998 || Socorro || LINEAR || GEF || align=right | 4.1 km || 
|-id=133 bgcolor=#E9E9E9
| 162133 ||  || — || September 26, 1998 || Socorro || LINEAR || — || align=right | 4.9 km || 
|-id=134 bgcolor=#fefefe
| 162134 ||  || — || October 14, 1998 || Kitt Peak || Spacewatch || — || align=right data-sort-value="0.73" | 730 m || 
|-id=135 bgcolor=#E9E9E9
| 162135 ||  || — || October 3, 1998 || Anderson Mesa || LONEOS || — || align=right | 5.9 km || 
|-id=136 bgcolor=#E9E9E9
| 162136 ||  || — || October 22, 1998 || Caussols || ODAS || — || align=right | 3.2 km || 
|-id=137 bgcolor=#E9E9E9
| 162137 ||  || — || October 16, 1998 || Kitt Peak || Spacewatch || MRX || align=right | 1.8 km || 
|-id=138 bgcolor=#E9E9E9
| 162138 ||  || — || October 23, 1998 || Kitt Peak || Spacewatch || — || align=right | 3.7 km || 
|-id=139 bgcolor=#E9E9E9
| 162139 ||  || — || October 28, 1998 || Socorro || LINEAR || — || align=right | 4.2 km || 
|-id=140 bgcolor=#E9E9E9
| 162140 ||  || — || October 18, 1998 || La Silla || E. W. Elst || — || align=right | 3.5 km || 
|-id=141 bgcolor=#E9E9E9
| 162141 ||  || — || October 28, 1998 || Socorro || LINEAR || — || align=right | 3.9 km || 
|-id=142 bgcolor=#FFC2E0
| 162142 || 1998 VR || — || November 10, 1998 || Socorro || LINEAR || ATE || align=right data-sort-value="0.46" | 460 m || 
|-id=143 bgcolor=#E9E9E9
| 162143 ||  || — || November 10, 1998 || Socorro || LINEAR || — || align=right | 6.3 km || 
|-id=144 bgcolor=#E9E9E9
| 162144 ||  || — || November 11, 1998 || Chichibu || N. Satō || — || align=right | 6.0 km || 
|-id=145 bgcolor=#E9E9E9
| 162145 ||  || — || November 23, 1998 || Kitt Peak || Spacewatch || AER || align=right | 2.1 km || 
|-id=146 bgcolor=#E9E9E9
| 162146 ||  || — || December 14, 1998 || Socorro || LINEAR || CLO || align=right | 4.8 km || 
|-id=147 bgcolor=#E9E9E9
| 162147 ||  || — || December 15, 1998 || Socorro || LINEAR || GEF || align=right | 3.0 km || 
|-id=148 bgcolor=#E9E9E9
| 162148 ||  || — || December 15, 1998 || Socorro || LINEAR || — || align=right | 5.2 km || 
|-id=149 bgcolor=#FFC2E0
| 162149 ||  || — || December 23, 1998 || Socorro || LINEAR || AMO +1km || align=right | 1.2 km || 
|-id=150 bgcolor=#d6d6d6
| 162150 ||  || — || December 25, 1998 || Kitt Peak || Spacewatch || — || align=right | 3.4 km || 
|-id=151 bgcolor=#d6d6d6
| 162151 ||  || — || January 7, 1999 || Kitt Peak || Spacewatch || — || align=right | 5.3 km || 
|-id=152 bgcolor=#d6d6d6
| 162152 ||  || — || January 8, 1999 || Kitt Peak || Spacewatch || EOS || align=right | 2.9 km || 
|-id=153 bgcolor=#fefefe
| 162153 ||  || — || January 10, 1999 || Kitt Peak || Spacewatch || — || align=right | 1.3 km || 
|-id=154 bgcolor=#fefefe
| 162154 ||  || — || January 13, 1999 || Kitt Peak || Spacewatch || — || align=right data-sort-value="0.98" | 980 m || 
|-id=155 bgcolor=#d6d6d6
| 162155 ||  || — || January 21, 1999 || Višnjan Observatory || K. Korlević || — || align=right | 4.7 km || 
|-id=156 bgcolor=#d6d6d6
| 162156 ||  || — || January 18, 1999 || Kitt Peak || Spacewatch || VER || align=right | 6.9 km || 
|-id=157 bgcolor=#FFC2E0
| 162157 ||  || — || February 11, 1999 || Socorro || LINEAR || APO || align=right data-sort-value="0.39" | 390 m || 
|-id=158 bgcolor=#E9E9E9
| 162158 Merrillhess ||  ||  || February 15, 1999 || Baton Rouge || W. R. Cooney Jr., E. Kandler || — || align=right | 6.7 km || 
|-id=159 bgcolor=#d6d6d6
| 162159 ||  || — || February 9, 1999 || Kitt Peak || Spacewatch || — || align=right | 4.4 km || 
|-id=160 bgcolor=#fefefe
| 162160 ||  || — || February 10, 1999 || Kitt Peak || Spacewatch || FLO || align=right | 1.2 km || 
|-id=161 bgcolor=#FFC2E0
| 162161 ||  || — || February 18, 1999 || Socorro || LINEAR || AMO +1km || align=right | 1.3 km || 
|-id=162 bgcolor=#FFC2E0
| 162162 ||  || — || February 26, 1999 || Socorro || LINEAR || APOPHA || align=right data-sort-value="0.41" | 410 m || 
|-id=163 bgcolor=#fefefe
| 162163 || 1999 ER || — || March 6, 1999 || Kitt Peak || Spacewatch || — || align=right | 1.1 km || 
|-id=164 bgcolor=#d6d6d6
| 162164 ||  || — || March 14, 1999 || Kitt Peak || Spacewatch || — || align=right | 4.7 km || 
|-id=165 bgcolor=#d6d6d6
| 162165 ||  || — || March 20, 1999 || Socorro || LINEAR || — || align=right | 6.0 km || 
|-id=166 bgcolor=#fefefe
| 162166 Mantsch ||  ||  || March 20, 1999 || Apache Point || SDSS || — || align=right | 1.6 km || 
|-id=167 bgcolor=#fefefe
| 162167 ||  || — || April 13, 1999 || Višnjan Observatory || K. Korlević || ERI || align=right | 3.5 km || 
|-id=168 bgcolor=#FFC2E0
| 162168 ||  || — || April 15, 1999 || Socorro || LINEAR || AMO +1km || align=right | 1.3 km || 
|-id=169 bgcolor=#fefefe
| 162169 ||  || — || April 14, 1999 || Kitt Peak || Spacewatch || — || align=right | 1.5 km || 
|-id=170 bgcolor=#fefefe
| 162170 ||  || — || April 12, 1999 || Socorro || LINEAR || NYS || align=right | 1.3 km || 
|-id=171 bgcolor=#d6d6d6
| 162171 ||  || — || April 9, 1999 || Kitt Peak || Spacewatch || — || align=right | 7.6 km || 
|-id=172 bgcolor=#fefefe
| 162172 ||  || — || April 7, 1999 || Socorro || LINEAR || PHO || align=right | 1.7 km || 
|-id=173 bgcolor=#FFC2E0
| 162173 Ryugu ||  ||  || May 10, 1999 || Socorro || LINEAR || APOPHA || align=right data-sort-value="0.47" | 470 m || 
|-id=174 bgcolor=#fefefe
| 162174 ||  || — || May 12, 1999 || Socorro || LINEAR || — || align=right | 2.1 km || 
|-id=175 bgcolor=#fefefe
| 162175 ||  || — || May 10, 1999 || Socorro || LINEAR || — || align=right | 1.7 km || 
|-id=176 bgcolor=#fefefe
| 162176 ||  || — || May 12, 1999 || Socorro || LINEAR || ERI || align=right | 1.3 km || 
|-id=177 bgcolor=#fefefe
| 162177 ||  || — || May 13, 1999 || Socorro || LINEAR || — || align=right | 1.8 km || 
|-id=178 bgcolor=#fefefe
| 162178 ||  || — || May 13, 1999 || Socorro || LINEAR || — || align=right | 1.3 km || 
|-id=179 bgcolor=#fefefe
| 162179 ||  || — || May 10, 1999 || Socorro || LINEAR || NYS || align=right | 1.3 km || 
|-id=180 bgcolor=#fefefe
| 162180 ||  || — || May 20, 1999 || Bergisch Gladbach || W. Bickel || — || align=right | 1.7 km || 
|-id=181 bgcolor=#FFC2E0
| 162181 ||  || — || June 10, 1999 || Socorro || LINEAR || APO +1km || align=right data-sort-value="0.73" | 730 m || 
|-id=182 bgcolor=#fefefe
| 162182 ||  || — || June 8, 1999 || Kitt Peak || Spacewatch || — || align=right | 1.6 km || 
|-id=183 bgcolor=#FFC2E0
| 162183 ||  || — || July 13, 1999 || Socorro || LINEAR || APOPHA || align=right data-sort-value="0.21" | 210 m || 
|-id=184 bgcolor=#fefefe
| 162184 ||  || — || July 14, 1999 || Socorro || LINEAR || — || align=right | 1.5 km || 
|-id=185 bgcolor=#fefefe
| 162185 ||  || — || July 14, 1999 || Socorro || LINEAR || — || align=right | 4.8 km || 
|-id=186 bgcolor=#FFC2E0
| 162186 ||  || — || July 22, 1999 || Socorro || LINEAR || AMO +1km || align=right | 3.5 km || 
|-id=187 bgcolor=#E9E9E9
| 162187 ||  || — || August 31, 1999 || Ondřejov || L. Kotková || — || align=right | 1.4 km || 
|-id=188 bgcolor=#fefefe
| 162188 ||  || — || September 6, 1999 || Catalina || CSS || H || align=right | 1.2 km || 
|-id=189 bgcolor=#fefefe
| 162189 ||  || — || September 6, 1999 || Catalina || CSS || H || align=right | 1.0 km || 
|-id=190 bgcolor=#fefefe
| 162190 ||  || — || September 7, 1999 || Socorro || LINEAR || H || align=right data-sort-value="0.86" | 860 m || 
|-id=191 bgcolor=#fefefe
| 162191 ||  || — || September 7, 1999 || Socorro || LINEAR || — || align=right | 1.2 km || 
|-id=192 bgcolor=#FA8072
| 162192 ||  || — || September 7, 1999 || Socorro || LINEAR || H || align=right | 1.3 km || 
|-id=193 bgcolor=#fefefe
| 162193 ||  || — || September 8, 1999 || Socorro || LINEAR || H || align=right data-sort-value="0.75" | 750 m || 
|-id=194 bgcolor=#E9E9E9
| 162194 ||  || — || September 11, 1999 || Višnjan Observatory || K. Korlević || — || align=right | 1.7 km || 
|-id=195 bgcolor=#FFC2E0
| 162195 ||  || — || September 13, 1999 || Socorro || LINEAR || APO || align=right data-sort-value="0.48" | 480 m || 
|-id=196 bgcolor=#FFC2E0
| 162196 ||  || — || September 14, 1999 || Socorro || LINEAR || AMO || align=right data-sort-value="0.65" | 650 m || 
|-id=197 bgcolor=#fefefe
| 162197 ||  || — || September 7, 1999 || Socorro || LINEAR || — || align=right | 1.8 km || 
|-id=198 bgcolor=#fefefe
| 162198 ||  || — || September 7, 1999 || Socorro || LINEAR || NYS || align=right | 1.4 km || 
|-id=199 bgcolor=#fefefe
| 162199 ||  || — || September 8, 1999 || Socorro || LINEAR || — || align=right | 1.9 km || 
|-id=200 bgcolor=#E9E9E9
| 162200 ||  || — || September 8, 1999 || Socorro || LINEAR || KON || align=right | 4.4 km || 
|}

162201–162300 

|-bgcolor=#fefefe
| 162201 ||  || — || September 9, 1999 || Socorro || LINEAR || H || align=right data-sort-value="0.90" | 900 m || 
|-id=202 bgcolor=#E9E9E9
| 162202 ||  || — || September 9, 1999 || Socorro || LINEAR || — || align=right | 1.5 km || 
|-id=203 bgcolor=#E9E9E9
| 162203 ||  || — || September 9, 1999 || Socorro || LINEAR || — || align=right | 1.5 km || 
|-id=204 bgcolor=#fefefe
| 162204 ||  || — || September 9, 1999 || Socorro || LINEAR || — || align=right | 3.6 km || 
|-id=205 bgcolor=#E9E9E9
| 162205 ||  || — || September 9, 1999 || Socorro || LINEAR || — || align=right | 1.5 km || 
|-id=206 bgcolor=#fefefe
| 162206 ||  || — || September 9, 1999 || Socorro || LINEAR || NYS || align=right | 1.3 km || 
|-id=207 bgcolor=#E9E9E9
| 162207 ||  || — || September 8, 1999 || Socorro || LINEAR || — || align=right | 1.8 km || 
|-id=208 bgcolor=#fefefe
| 162208 ||  || — || September 6, 1999 || Anderson Mesa || LONEOS || H || align=right data-sort-value="0.93" | 930 m || 
|-id=209 bgcolor=#E9E9E9
| 162209 ||  || — || September 24, 1999 || Socorro || LINEAR || BAR || align=right | 2.9 km || 
|-id=210 bgcolor=#FFC2E0
| 162210 ||  || — || September 28, 1999 || Socorro || LINEAR || APOPHA || align=right data-sort-value="0.54" | 540 m || 
|-id=211 bgcolor=#E9E9E9
| 162211 ||  || — || September 30, 1999 || Socorro || LINEAR || — || align=right | 4.5 km || 
|-id=212 bgcolor=#E9E9E9
| 162212 ||  || — || September 30, 1999 || Catalina || CSS || — || align=right | 3.7 km || 
|-id=213 bgcolor=#E9E9E9
| 162213 ||  || — || October 4, 1999 || Prescott || P. G. Comba || — || align=right | 1.3 km || 
|-id=214 bgcolor=#FFC2E0
| 162214 ||  || — || October 8, 1999 || Catalina || CSS || APOcritical || align=right data-sort-value="0.68" | 680 m || 
|-id=215 bgcolor=#FFC2E0
| 162215 ||  || — || October 10, 1999 || Socorro || LINEAR || APO || align=right data-sort-value="0.54" | 540 m || 
|-id=216 bgcolor=#E9E9E9
| 162216 ||  || — || October 10, 1999 || Oizumi || T. Kobayashi || — || align=right | 1.2 km || 
|-id=217 bgcolor=#E9E9E9
| 162217 ||  || — || October 4, 1999 || Socorro || LINEAR || — || align=right | 1.3 km || 
|-id=218 bgcolor=#E9E9E9
| 162218 ||  || — || October 6, 1999 || Kitt Peak || Spacewatch || — || align=right | 2.1 km || 
|-id=219 bgcolor=#E9E9E9
| 162219 ||  || — || October 7, 1999 || Kitt Peak || Spacewatch || — || align=right | 2.8 km || 
|-id=220 bgcolor=#E9E9E9
| 162220 ||  || — || October 11, 1999 || Kitt Peak || Spacewatch || — || align=right | 1.1 km || 
|-id=221 bgcolor=#E9E9E9
| 162221 ||  || — || October 15, 1999 || Kitt Peak || Spacewatch || — || align=right | 2.3 km || 
|-id=222 bgcolor=#E9E9E9
| 162222 ||  || — || October 2, 1999 || Socorro || LINEAR || — || align=right | 4.7 km || 
|-id=223 bgcolor=#E9E9E9
| 162223 ||  || — || October 4, 1999 || Socorro || LINEAR || — || align=right | 2.2 km || 
|-id=224 bgcolor=#E9E9E9
| 162224 ||  || — || October 4, 1999 || Socorro || LINEAR || — || align=right | 1.8 km || 
|-id=225 bgcolor=#E9E9E9
| 162225 ||  || — || October 4, 1999 || Socorro || LINEAR || — || align=right | 1.6 km || 
|-id=226 bgcolor=#E9E9E9
| 162226 ||  || — || October 4, 1999 || Socorro || LINEAR || — || align=right | 1.6 km || 
|-id=227 bgcolor=#d6d6d6
| 162227 ||  || — || October 4, 1999 || Socorro || LINEAR || SHU3:2 || align=right | 8.3 km || 
|-id=228 bgcolor=#E9E9E9
| 162228 ||  || — || October 6, 1999 || Socorro || LINEAR || — || align=right | 1.5 km || 
|-id=229 bgcolor=#E9E9E9
| 162229 ||  || — || October 7, 1999 || Socorro || LINEAR || — || align=right | 1.4 km || 
|-id=230 bgcolor=#E9E9E9
| 162230 ||  || — || October 7, 1999 || Socorro || LINEAR || — || align=right | 1.3 km || 
|-id=231 bgcolor=#fefefe
| 162231 ||  || — || October 15, 1999 || Socorro || LINEAR || — || align=right | 1.6 km || 
|-id=232 bgcolor=#d6d6d6
| 162232 ||  || — || October 7, 1999 || Socorro || LINEAR || Tj (2.91) || align=right | 6.5 km || 
|-id=233 bgcolor=#E9E9E9
| 162233 ||  || — || October 10, 1999 || Socorro || LINEAR || — || align=right | 1.5 km || 
|-id=234 bgcolor=#E9E9E9
| 162234 ||  || — || October 12, 1999 || Socorro || LINEAR || EUN || align=right | 2.4 km || 
|-id=235 bgcolor=#fefefe
| 162235 ||  || — || October 12, 1999 || Socorro || LINEAR || H || align=right | 1.1 km || 
|-id=236 bgcolor=#E9E9E9
| 162236 ||  || — || October 12, 1999 || Socorro || LINEAR || ADE || align=right | 3.9 km || 
|-id=237 bgcolor=#E9E9E9
| 162237 ||  || — || October 12, 1999 || Socorro || LINEAR || — || align=right | 1.6 km || 
|-id=238 bgcolor=#E9E9E9
| 162238 ||  || — || October 12, 1999 || Socorro || LINEAR || — || align=right | 3.2 km || 
|-id=239 bgcolor=#E9E9E9
| 162239 ||  || — || October 12, 1999 || Socorro || LINEAR || — || align=right | 1.5 km || 
|-id=240 bgcolor=#E9E9E9
| 162240 ||  || — || October 14, 1999 || Socorro || LINEAR || — || align=right | 2.1 km || 
|-id=241 bgcolor=#E9E9E9
| 162241 ||  || — || October 15, 1999 || Socorro || LINEAR || — || align=right | 1.4 km || 
|-id=242 bgcolor=#E9E9E9
| 162242 ||  || — || October 1, 1999 || Catalina || CSS || — || align=right | 1.4 km || 
|-id=243 bgcolor=#E9E9E9
| 162243 ||  || — || October 2, 1999 || Anderson Mesa || LONEOS || — || align=right | 1.7 km || 
|-id=244 bgcolor=#E9E9E9
| 162244 ||  || — || October 3, 1999 || Catalina || CSS || — || align=right | 2.8 km || 
|-id=245 bgcolor=#E9E9E9
| 162245 ||  || — || October 4, 1999 || Catalina || CSS || — || align=right | 1.8 km || 
|-id=246 bgcolor=#E9E9E9
| 162246 ||  || — || October 8, 1999 || Catalina || CSS || — || align=right | 1.6 km || 
|-id=247 bgcolor=#E9E9E9
| 162247 ||  || — || October 9, 1999 || Socorro || LINEAR || — || align=right | 2.9 km || 
|-id=248 bgcolor=#E9E9E9
| 162248 ||  || — || October 3, 1999 || Socorro || LINEAR || ADE || align=right | 4.7 km || 
|-id=249 bgcolor=#E9E9E9
| 162249 ||  || — || October 6, 1999 || Socorro || LINEAR || — || align=right | 2.4 km || 
|-id=250 bgcolor=#E9E9E9
| 162250 ||  || — || October 10, 1999 || Socorro || LINEAR || — || align=right | 2.2 km || 
|-id=251 bgcolor=#E9E9E9
| 162251 ||  || — || October 10, 1999 || Socorro || LINEAR || — || align=right | 1.9 km || 
|-id=252 bgcolor=#E9E9E9
| 162252 ||  || — || October 10, 1999 || Socorro || LINEAR || — || align=right | 1.3 km || 
|-id=253 bgcolor=#E9E9E9
| 162253 ||  || — || October 2, 1999 || Kitt Peak || Spacewatch || — || align=right | 1.4 km || 
|-id=254 bgcolor=#E9E9E9
| 162254 ||  || — || October 9, 1999 || Socorro || LINEAR || — || align=right | 2.8 km || 
|-id=255 bgcolor=#E9E9E9
| 162255 ||  || — || October 9, 1999 || Socorro || LINEAR || — || align=right | 3.3 km || 
|-id=256 bgcolor=#d6d6d6
| 162256 ||  || — || October 7, 1999 || Socorro || LINEAR || HIL3:2 || align=right | 8.8 km || 
|-id=257 bgcolor=#E9E9E9
| 162257 ||  || — || October 7, 1999 || Socorro || LINEAR || — || align=right | 1.6 km || 
|-id=258 bgcolor=#E9E9E9
| 162258 ||  || — || October 2, 1999 || Socorro || LINEAR || — || align=right | 1.3 km || 
|-id=259 bgcolor=#E9E9E9
| 162259 ||  || — || October 31, 1999 || Socorro || LINEAR || — || align=right | 7.0 km || 
|-id=260 bgcolor=#fefefe
| 162260 ||  || — || October 31, 1999 || Socorro || LINEAR || H || align=right | 1.2 km || 
|-id=261 bgcolor=#fefefe
| 162261 ||  || — || October 30, 1999 || Catalina || CSS || H || align=right data-sort-value="0.97" | 970 m || 
|-id=262 bgcolor=#E9E9E9
| 162262 ||  || — || October 31, 1999 || Kitt Peak || Spacewatch || — || align=right | 1.4 km || 
|-id=263 bgcolor=#E9E9E9
| 162263 ||  || — || October 28, 1999 || Catalina || CSS || — || align=right | 1.3 km || 
|-id=264 bgcolor=#E9E9E9
| 162264 ||  || — || October 29, 1999 || Anderson Mesa || LONEOS || — || align=right | 3.2 km || 
|-id=265 bgcolor=#E9E9E9
| 162265 ||  || — || October 29, 1999 || Anderson Mesa || LONEOS || — || align=right | 2.3 km || 
|-id=266 bgcolor=#E9E9E9
| 162266 ||  || — || October 31, 1999 || Catalina || CSS || — || align=right | 1.6 km || 
|-id=267 bgcolor=#E9E9E9
| 162267 ||  || — || October 29, 1999 || Anderson Mesa || LONEOS || — || align=right | 2.1 km || 
|-id=268 bgcolor=#E9E9E9
| 162268 ||  || — || October 31, 1999 || Catalina || CSS || — || align=right | 2.0 km || 
|-id=269 bgcolor=#FFC2E0
| 162269 ||  || — || November 5, 1999 || Socorro || LINEAR || APO +1km || align=right | 1.0 km || 
|-id=270 bgcolor=#E9E9E9
| 162270 ||  || — || November 7, 1999 || Višnjan Observatory || K. Korlević || — || align=right | 2.8 km || 
|-id=271 bgcolor=#E9E9E9
| 162271 ||  || — || November 8, 1999 || Višnjan Observatory || K. Korlević || — || align=right | 1.8 km || 
|-id=272 bgcolor=#E9E9E9
| 162272 ||  || — || November 9, 1999 || Višnjan Observatory || K. Korlević || — || align=right | 5.8 km || 
|-id=273 bgcolor=#FFC2E0
| 162273 ||  || — || November 9, 1999 || Socorro || LINEAR || AMO +1km || align=right | 1.3 km || 
|-id=274 bgcolor=#E9E9E9
| 162274 ||  || — || November 10, 1999 || Višnjan Observatory || K. Korlević || — || align=right | 1.8 km || 
|-id=275 bgcolor=#E9E9E9
| 162275 ||  || — || November 12, 1999 || Višnjan Observatory || K. Korlević || — || align=right | 2.2 km || 
|-id=276 bgcolor=#E9E9E9
| 162276 ||  || — || November 3, 1999 || Socorro || LINEAR || — || align=right | 2.1 km || 
|-id=277 bgcolor=#E9E9E9
| 162277 ||  || — || November 4, 1999 || Catalina || CSS || — || align=right | 1.8 km || 
|-id=278 bgcolor=#E9E9E9
| 162278 ||  || — || November 3, 1999 || Socorro || LINEAR || — || align=right | 1.7 km || 
|-id=279 bgcolor=#E9E9E9
| 162279 ||  || — || November 4, 1999 || Socorro || LINEAR || — || align=right | 2.8 km || 
|-id=280 bgcolor=#d6d6d6
| 162280 ||  || — || November 4, 1999 || Socorro || LINEAR || SHU3:2 || align=right | 9.6 km || 
|-id=281 bgcolor=#E9E9E9
| 162281 ||  || — || November 4, 1999 || Socorro || LINEAR || — || align=right | 1.7 km || 
|-id=282 bgcolor=#E9E9E9
| 162282 ||  || — || November 4, 1999 || Socorro || LINEAR || — || align=right | 3.0 km || 
|-id=283 bgcolor=#E9E9E9
| 162283 ||  || — || November 1, 1999 || Kitt Peak || Spacewatch || — || align=right | 1.1 km || 
|-id=284 bgcolor=#d6d6d6
| 162284 ||  || — || November 3, 1999 || Socorro || LINEAR || HIL3:2 || align=right | 10 km || 
|-id=285 bgcolor=#E9E9E9
| 162285 ||  || — || November 5, 1999 || Socorro || LINEAR || — || align=right | 2.1 km || 
|-id=286 bgcolor=#E9E9E9
| 162286 ||  || — || November 9, 1999 || Socorro || LINEAR || — || align=right | 2.5 km || 
|-id=287 bgcolor=#E9E9E9
| 162287 ||  || — || November 9, 1999 || Socorro || LINEAR || — || align=right | 1.0 km || 
|-id=288 bgcolor=#E9E9E9
| 162288 ||  || — || November 5, 1999 || Kitt Peak || Spacewatch || HEN || align=right | 1.1 km || 
|-id=289 bgcolor=#E9E9E9
| 162289 ||  || — || November 6, 1999 || Kitt Peak || Spacewatch || — || align=right | 1.6 km || 
|-id=290 bgcolor=#E9E9E9
| 162290 ||  || — || November 11, 1999 || Kitt Peak || Spacewatch || — || align=right | 2.3 km || 
|-id=291 bgcolor=#E9E9E9
| 162291 ||  || — || November 12, 1999 || Socorro || LINEAR || HEN || align=right | 1.5 km || 
|-id=292 bgcolor=#E9E9E9
| 162292 ||  || — || November 10, 1999 || Kitt Peak || Spacewatch || — || align=right | 2.2 km || 
|-id=293 bgcolor=#E9E9E9
| 162293 ||  || — || November 13, 1999 || Kitt Peak || Spacewatch || — || align=right | 1.6 km || 
|-id=294 bgcolor=#E9E9E9
| 162294 ||  || — || November 14, 1999 || Socorro || LINEAR || — || align=right | 1.8 km || 
|-id=295 bgcolor=#E9E9E9
| 162295 ||  || — || November 14, 1999 || Socorro || LINEAR || — || align=right | 2.3 km || 
|-id=296 bgcolor=#E9E9E9
| 162296 ||  || — || November 14, 1999 || Socorro || LINEAR || — || align=right | 1.3 km || 
|-id=297 bgcolor=#E9E9E9
| 162297 ||  || — || November 14, 1999 || Socorro || LINEAR || — || align=right | 2.9 km || 
|-id=298 bgcolor=#E9E9E9
| 162298 ||  || — || November 4, 1999 || Kitt Peak || Spacewatch || — || align=right | 3.2 km || 
|-id=299 bgcolor=#fefefe
| 162299 ||  || — || November 7, 1999 || Socorro || LINEAR || H || align=right | 1.1 km || 
|-id=300 bgcolor=#fefefe
| 162300 ||  || — || November 7, 1999 || Socorro || LINEAR || H || align=right | 1.1 km || 
|}

162301–162400 

|-bgcolor=#E9E9E9
| 162301 ||  || — || November 14, 1999 || Socorro || LINEAR || — || align=right | 1.5 km || 
|-id=302 bgcolor=#E9E9E9
| 162302 ||  || — || November 15, 1999 || Socorro || LINEAR || — || align=right | 2.0 km || 
|-id=303 bgcolor=#fefefe
| 162303 ||  || — || November 15, 1999 || Socorro || LINEAR || H || align=right data-sort-value="0.97" | 970 m || 
|-id=304 bgcolor=#E9E9E9
| 162304 ||  || — || November 3, 1999 || Anderson Mesa || LONEOS || — || align=right | 1.7 km || 
|-id=305 bgcolor=#E9E9E9
| 162305 ||  || — || November 1, 1999 || Catalina || CSS || — || align=right | 1.9 km || 
|-id=306 bgcolor=#E9E9E9
| 162306 ||  || — || November 5, 1999 || Catalina || CSS || — || align=right | 3.4 km || 
|-id=307 bgcolor=#E9E9E9
| 162307 ||  || — || November 13, 1999 || Catalina || CSS || — || align=right | 3.6 km || 
|-id=308 bgcolor=#E9E9E9
| 162308 ||  || — || November 5, 1999 || Socorro || LINEAR || — || align=right | 1.3 km || 
|-id=309 bgcolor=#E9E9E9
| 162309 ||  || — || November 28, 1999 || Kitt Peak || Spacewatch || — || align=right | 1.4 km || 
|-id=310 bgcolor=#E9E9E9
| 162310 ||  || — || November 29, 1999 || Višnjan Observatory || K. Korlević || — || align=right | 1.8 km || 
|-id=311 bgcolor=#E9E9E9
| 162311 ||  || — || November 30, 1999 || Kitt Peak || Spacewatch || — || align=right | 1.6 km || 
|-id=312 bgcolor=#E9E9E9
| 162312 ||  || — || November 16, 1999 || Socorro || LINEAR || — || align=right | 1.7 km || 
|-id=313 bgcolor=#E9E9E9
| 162313 ||  || — || November 17, 1999 || Kitt Peak || Spacewatch || HEN || align=right | 1.4 km || 
|-id=314 bgcolor=#d6d6d6
| 162314 ||  || — || December 4, 1999 || Catalina || CSS || HIL3:2 || align=right | 9.9 km || 
|-id=315 bgcolor=#E9E9E9
| 162315 ||  || — || December 5, 1999 || Catalina || CSS || — || align=right | 1.8 km || 
|-id=316 bgcolor=#E9E9E9
| 162316 ||  || — || December 6, 1999 || Socorro || LINEAR || MIT || align=right | 4.3 km || 
|-id=317 bgcolor=#E9E9E9
| 162317 ||  || — || December 6, 1999 || Socorro || LINEAR || — || align=right | 2.0 km || 
|-id=318 bgcolor=#E9E9E9
| 162318 ||  || — || December 6, 1999 || Socorro || LINEAR || — || align=right | 2.8 km || 
|-id=319 bgcolor=#E9E9E9
| 162319 ||  || — || December 6, 1999 || Socorro || LINEAR || — || align=right | 1.7 km || 
|-id=320 bgcolor=#E9E9E9
| 162320 ||  || — || December 6, 1999 || Socorro || LINEAR || — || align=right | 1.9 km || 
|-id=321 bgcolor=#E9E9E9
| 162321 ||  || — || December 6, 1999 || Socorro || LINEAR || — || align=right | 2.0 km || 
|-id=322 bgcolor=#E9E9E9
| 162322 ||  || — || December 7, 1999 || Socorro || LINEAR || — || align=right | 1.8 km || 
|-id=323 bgcolor=#E9E9E9
| 162323 ||  || — || December 7, 1999 || Socorro || LINEAR || — || align=right | 2.0 km || 
|-id=324 bgcolor=#E9E9E9
| 162324 ||  || — || December 7, 1999 || Socorro || LINEAR || — || align=right | 1.7 km || 
|-id=325 bgcolor=#E9E9E9
| 162325 ||  || — || December 7, 1999 || Socorro || LINEAR || — || align=right | 2.0 km || 
|-id=326 bgcolor=#E9E9E9
| 162326 ||  || — || December 7, 1999 || Socorro || LINEAR || — || align=right | 2.2 km || 
|-id=327 bgcolor=#E9E9E9
| 162327 ||  || — || December 7, 1999 || Socorro || LINEAR || — || align=right | 3.2 km || 
|-id=328 bgcolor=#E9E9E9
| 162328 ||  || — || December 7, 1999 || Socorro || LINEAR || — || align=right | 2.8 km || 
|-id=329 bgcolor=#E9E9E9
| 162329 ||  || — || December 7, 1999 || Socorro || LINEAR || — || align=right | 2.1 km || 
|-id=330 bgcolor=#E9E9E9
| 162330 ||  || — || December 7, 1999 || Socorro || LINEAR || — || align=right | 1.6 km || 
|-id=331 bgcolor=#E9E9E9
| 162331 ||  || — || December 7, 1999 || Socorro || LINEAR || — || align=right | 3.7 km || 
|-id=332 bgcolor=#E9E9E9
| 162332 ||  || — || December 7, 1999 || Socorro || LINEAR || — || align=right | 2.3 km || 
|-id=333 bgcolor=#E9E9E9
| 162333 ||  || — || December 7, 1999 || Socorro || LINEAR || — || align=right | 2.9 km || 
|-id=334 bgcolor=#E9E9E9
| 162334 ||  || — || December 7, 1999 || Socorro || LINEAR || EUN || align=right | 2.8 km || 
|-id=335 bgcolor=#E9E9E9
| 162335 ||  || — || December 11, 1999 || Socorro || LINEAR || — || align=right | 2.3 km || 
|-id=336 bgcolor=#E9E9E9
| 162336 ||  || — || December 5, 1999 || Catalina || CSS || — || align=right | 1.6 km || 
|-id=337 bgcolor=#E9E9E9
| 162337 ||  || — || December 7, 1999 || Catalina || CSS || — || align=right | 3.4 km || 
|-id=338 bgcolor=#E9E9E9
| 162338 ||  || — || December 12, 1999 || Socorro || LINEAR || — || align=right | 3.2 km || 
|-id=339 bgcolor=#E9E9E9
| 162339 ||  || — || December 12, 1999 || Socorro || LINEAR || — || align=right | 2.6 km || 
|-id=340 bgcolor=#E9E9E9
| 162340 ||  || — || December 5, 1999 || Socorro || LINEAR || — || align=right | 2.1 km || 
|-id=341 bgcolor=#E9E9E9
| 162341 ||  || — || December 5, 1999 || Socorro || LINEAR || — || align=right | 3.2 km || 
|-id=342 bgcolor=#E9E9E9
| 162342 ||  || — || December 5, 1999 || Kitt Peak || Spacewatch || PAD || align=right | 3.8 km || 
|-id=343 bgcolor=#E9E9E9
| 162343 ||  || — || December 8, 1999 || Socorro || LINEAR || — || align=right | 1.5 km || 
|-id=344 bgcolor=#E9E9E9
| 162344 ||  || — || December 8, 1999 || Socorro || LINEAR || — || align=right | 1.9 km || 
|-id=345 bgcolor=#E9E9E9
| 162345 ||  || — || December 8, 1999 || Kitt Peak || Spacewatch || — || align=right | 5.0 km || 
|-id=346 bgcolor=#E9E9E9
| 162346 ||  || — || December 10, 1999 || Socorro || LINEAR || RAF || align=right | 2.1 km || 
|-id=347 bgcolor=#E9E9E9
| 162347 ||  || — || December 10, 1999 || Socorro || LINEAR || — || align=right | 2.1 km || 
|-id=348 bgcolor=#E9E9E9
| 162348 ||  || — || December 12, 1999 || Socorro || LINEAR || — || align=right | 2.6 km || 
|-id=349 bgcolor=#E9E9E9
| 162349 ||  || — || December 13, 1999 || Socorro || LINEAR || — || align=right | 1.4 km || 
|-id=350 bgcolor=#E9E9E9
| 162350 ||  || — || December 14, 1999 || Socorro || LINEAR || MAR || align=right | 1.9 km || 
|-id=351 bgcolor=#E9E9E9
| 162351 ||  || — || December 15, 1999 || Socorro || LINEAR || — || align=right | 2.7 km || 
|-id=352 bgcolor=#C2FFFF
| 162352 ||  || — || December 14, 1999 || Kitt Peak || Spacewatch || L4 || align=right | 12 km || 
|-id=353 bgcolor=#E9E9E9
| 162353 || 1999 YX || — || December 16, 1999 || Fountain Hills || C. W. Juels || — || align=right | 1.6 km || 
|-id=354 bgcolor=#E9E9E9
| 162354 ||  || — || December 28, 1999 || Socorro || LINEAR || — || align=right | 5.8 km || 
|-id=355 bgcolor=#E9E9E9
| 162355 ||  || — || December 29, 1999 || Socorro || LINEAR || BAR || align=right | 2.4 km || 
|-id=356 bgcolor=#E9E9E9
| 162356 ||  || — || December 29, 1999 || Socorro || LINEAR || — || align=right | 7.1 km || 
|-id=357 bgcolor=#E9E9E9
| 162357 ||  || — || December 30, 1999 || Socorro || LINEAR || ADE || align=right | 6.0 km || 
|-id=358 bgcolor=#E9E9E9
| 162358 ||  || — || December 27, 1999 || Kitt Peak || Spacewatch || ADE || align=right | 3.4 km || 
|-id=359 bgcolor=#E9E9E9
| 162359 ||  || — || December 27, 1999 || Kitt Peak || Spacewatch || — || align=right | 1.7 km || 
|-id=360 bgcolor=#E9E9E9
| 162360 ||  || — || January 2, 2000 || Socorro || LINEAR || ADE || align=right | 5.9 km || 
|-id=361 bgcolor=#FFC2E0
| 162361 ||  || — || January 4, 2000 || Socorro || LINEAR || ATEPHA || align=right data-sort-value="0.33" | 330 m || 
|-id=362 bgcolor=#E9E9E9
| 162362 ||  || — || January 3, 2000 || Socorro || LINEAR || EUN || align=right | 2.4 km || 
|-id=363 bgcolor=#E9E9E9
| 162363 ||  || — || January 3, 2000 || Socorro || LINEAR || — || align=right | 3.0 km || 
|-id=364 bgcolor=#E9E9E9
| 162364 ||  || — || January 5, 2000 || Socorro || LINEAR || RAF || align=right | 1.5 km || 
|-id=365 bgcolor=#E9E9E9
| 162365 ||  || — || January 5, 2000 || Socorro || LINEAR || — || align=right | 2.2 km || 
|-id=366 bgcolor=#E9E9E9
| 162366 ||  || — || January 5, 2000 || Socorro || LINEAR || — || align=right | 2.2 km || 
|-id=367 bgcolor=#E9E9E9
| 162367 ||  || — || January 5, 2000 || Socorro || LINEAR || — || align=right | 2.2 km || 
|-id=368 bgcolor=#E9E9E9
| 162368 ||  || — || January 5, 2000 || Socorro || LINEAR || — || align=right | 2.9 km || 
|-id=369 bgcolor=#E9E9E9
| 162369 ||  || — || January 5, 2000 || Socorro || LINEAR || — || align=right | 2.0 km || 
|-id=370 bgcolor=#E9E9E9
| 162370 ||  || — || January 5, 2000 || Socorro || LINEAR || — || align=right | 1.7 km || 
|-id=371 bgcolor=#E9E9E9
| 162371 ||  || — || January 7, 2000 || Socorro || LINEAR || — || align=right | 2.3 km || 
|-id=372 bgcolor=#E9E9E9
| 162372 ||  || — || January 7, 2000 || Socorro || LINEAR || — || align=right | 1.5 km || 
|-id=373 bgcolor=#E9E9E9
| 162373 ||  || — || January 3, 2000 || Socorro || LINEAR || — || align=right | 2.2 km || 
|-id=374 bgcolor=#E9E9E9
| 162374 ||  || — || January 7, 2000 || Socorro || LINEAR || — || align=right | 3.1 km || 
|-id=375 bgcolor=#E9E9E9
| 162375 ||  || — || January 7, 2000 || Socorro || LINEAR || — || align=right | 2.3 km || 
|-id=376 bgcolor=#E9E9E9
| 162376 ||  || — || January 8, 2000 || Socorro || LINEAR || — || align=right | 3.9 km || 
|-id=377 bgcolor=#E9E9E9
| 162377 ||  || — || January 8, 2000 || Socorro || LINEAR || — || align=right | 4.5 km || 
|-id=378 bgcolor=#E9E9E9
| 162378 ||  || — || January 9, 2000 || Socorro || LINEAR || — || align=right | 4.2 km || 
|-id=379 bgcolor=#E9E9E9
| 162379 ||  || — || January 10, 2000 || Socorro || LINEAR || — || align=right | 4.6 km || 
|-id=380 bgcolor=#C2FFFF
| 162380 ||  || — || January 12, 2000 || Kitt Peak || Spacewatch || L4 || align=right | 13 km || 
|-id=381 bgcolor=#E9E9E9
| 162381 ||  || — || January 12, 2000 || Kitt Peak || Spacewatch || HOF || align=right | 5.3 km || 
|-id=382 bgcolor=#E9E9E9
| 162382 ||  || — || January 7, 2000 || Kitt Peak || Spacewatch || AGN || align=right | 2.2 km || 
|-id=383 bgcolor=#E9E9E9
| 162383 ||  || — || January 26, 2000 || Socorro || LINEAR || HNS || align=right | 2.4 km || 
|-id=384 bgcolor=#E9E9E9
| 162384 ||  || — || January 28, 2000 || Socorro || LINEAR || — || align=right | 2.6 km || 
|-id=385 bgcolor=#FFC2E0
| 162385 ||  || — || January 31, 2000 || Socorro || LINEAR || ATE || align=right data-sort-value="0.81" | 810 m || 
|-id=386 bgcolor=#E9E9E9
| 162386 ||  || — || January 30, 2000 || Socorro || LINEAR || — || align=right | 3.1 km || 
|-id=387 bgcolor=#d6d6d6
| 162387 ||  || — || January 26, 2000 || Kitt Peak || Spacewatch || — || align=right | 3.5 km || 
|-id=388 bgcolor=#C2FFFF
| 162388 ||  || — || January 27, 2000 || Kitt Peak || Spacewatch || L4 || align=right | 13 km || 
|-id=389 bgcolor=#E9E9E9
| 162389 ||  || — || February 2, 2000 || Socorro || LINEAR || — || align=right | 2.2 km || 
|-id=390 bgcolor=#E9E9E9
| 162390 ||  || — || February 2, 2000 || Socorro || LINEAR || — || align=right | 4.2 km || 
|-id=391 bgcolor=#E9E9E9
| 162391 ||  || — || February 2, 2000 || Socorro || LINEAR || — || align=right | 3.2 km || 
|-id=392 bgcolor=#E9E9E9
| 162392 ||  || — || February 2, 2000 || Socorro || LINEAR || — || align=right | 3.9 km || 
|-id=393 bgcolor=#d6d6d6
| 162393 ||  || — || February 4, 2000 || Socorro || LINEAR || EUP || align=right | 4.8 km || 
|-id=394 bgcolor=#E9E9E9
| 162394 ||  || — || February 10, 2000 || Kitt Peak || Spacewatch || — || align=right | 2.7 km || 
|-id=395 bgcolor=#E9E9E9
| 162395 ||  || — || February 5, 2000 || Kitt Peak || M. W. Buie || — || align=right | 3.4 km || 
|-id=396 bgcolor=#C2FFFF
| 162396 ||  || — || February 5, 2000 || Kitt Peak || M. W. Buie || L4 || align=right | 14 km || 
|-id=397 bgcolor=#d6d6d6
| 162397 ||  || — || February 4, 2000 || Kitt Peak || Spacewatch || FIR || align=right | 4.5 km || 
|-id=398 bgcolor=#E9E9E9
| 162398 ||  || — || February 27, 2000 || Needville || Needville Obs. || — || align=right | 3.9 km || 
|-id=399 bgcolor=#E9E9E9
| 162399 ||  || — || February 26, 2000 || Kitt Peak || Spacewatch || — || align=right | 3.8 km || 
|-id=400 bgcolor=#E9E9E9
| 162400 ||  || — || February 29, 2000 || Socorro || LINEAR || MIT || align=right | 5.9 km || 
|}

162401–162500 

|-bgcolor=#d6d6d6
| 162401 ||  || — || February 29, 2000 || Socorro || LINEAR || — || align=right | 3.7 km || 
|-id=402 bgcolor=#E9E9E9
| 162402 ||  || — || February 29, 2000 || Socorro || LINEAR || — || align=right | 2.5 km || 
|-id=403 bgcolor=#E9E9E9
| 162403 ||  || — || February 29, 2000 || Socorro || LINEAR || — || align=right | 3.7 km || 
|-id=404 bgcolor=#d6d6d6
| 162404 ||  || — || February 29, 2000 || Socorro || LINEAR || — || align=right | 7.5 km || 
|-id=405 bgcolor=#E9E9E9
| 162405 ||  || — || February 29, 2000 || Socorro || LINEAR || — || align=right | 4.2 km || 
|-id=406 bgcolor=#E9E9E9
| 162406 ||  || — || February 28, 2000 || Socorro || LINEAR || — || align=right | 4.6 km || 
|-id=407 bgcolor=#d6d6d6
| 162407 ||  || — || February 28, 2000 || Socorro || LINEAR || — || align=right | 3.7 km || 
|-id=408 bgcolor=#E9E9E9
| 162408 ||  || — || February 28, 2000 || Socorro || LINEAR || — || align=right | 4.3 km || 
|-id=409 bgcolor=#E9E9E9
| 162409 ||  || — || February 29, 2000 || Socorro || LINEAR || — || align=right | 2.6 km || 
|-id=410 bgcolor=#d6d6d6
| 162410 ||  || — || February 29, 2000 || Socorro || LINEAR || — || align=right | 5.9 km || 
|-id=411 bgcolor=#d6d6d6
| 162411 ||  || — || February 29, 2000 || Socorro || LINEAR || KOR || align=right | 2.6 km || 
|-id=412 bgcolor=#E9E9E9
| 162412 ||  || — || February 26, 2000 || Kitt Peak || Spacewatch || — || align=right | 4.1 km || 
|-id=413 bgcolor=#d6d6d6
| 162413 ||  || — || March 3, 2000 || Socorro || LINEAR || — || align=right | 4.7 km || 
|-id=414 bgcolor=#E9E9E9
| 162414 ||  || — || March 3, 2000 || Socorro || LINEAR || — || align=right | 3.0 km || 
|-id=415 bgcolor=#E9E9E9
| 162415 ||  || — || March 3, 2000 || Socorro || LINEAR || — || align=right | 4.9 km || 
|-id=416 bgcolor=#FFC2E0
| 162416 ||  || — || March 4, 2000 || Socorro || LINEAR || APOPHAcritical || align=right data-sort-value="0.16" | 160 m || 
|-id=417 bgcolor=#d6d6d6
| 162417 ||  || — || March 5, 2000 || Socorro || LINEAR || — || align=right | 7.7 km || 
|-id=418 bgcolor=#d6d6d6
| 162418 ||  || — || March 9, 2000 || Socorro || LINEAR || — || align=right | 4.5 km || 
|-id=419 bgcolor=#d6d6d6
| 162419 ||  || — || March 10, 2000 || Socorro || LINEAR || — || align=right | 3.4 km || 
|-id=420 bgcolor=#d6d6d6
| 162420 ||  || — || March 10, 2000 || Socorro || LINEAR || — || align=right | 4.5 km || 
|-id=421 bgcolor=#FFC2E0
| 162421 ||  || — || March 8, 2000 || Socorro || LINEAR || ATE +1kmPHA || align=right data-sort-value="0.89" | 890 m || 
|-id=422 bgcolor=#FFC2E0
| 162422 ||  || — || March 8, 2000 || Socorro || LINEAR || APOPHA || align=right data-sort-value="0.30" | 300 m || 
|-id=423 bgcolor=#d6d6d6
| 162423 ||  || — || March 9, 2000 || Socorro || LINEAR || EOS || align=right | 4.0 km || 
|-id=424 bgcolor=#d6d6d6
| 162424 ||  || — || March 9, 2000 || Kitt Peak || Spacewatch || — || align=right | 4.8 km || 
|-id=425 bgcolor=#d6d6d6
| 162425 ||  || — || March 11, 2000 || Socorro || LINEAR || — || align=right | 4.1 km || 
|-id=426 bgcolor=#d6d6d6
| 162426 ||  || — || March 3, 2000 || Socorro || LINEAR || — || align=right | 4.5 km || 
|-id=427 bgcolor=#d6d6d6
| 162427 ||  || — || March 3, 2000 || Socorro || LINEAR || — || align=right | 5.1 km || 
|-id=428 bgcolor=#d6d6d6
| 162428 ||  || — || March 3, 2000 || Socorro || LINEAR || — || align=right | 4.1 km || 
|-id=429 bgcolor=#d6d6d6
| 162429 ||  || — || March 3, 2000 || Socorro || LINEAR || — || align=right | 4.3 km || 
|-id=430 bgcolor=#d6d6d6
| 162430 ||  || — || March 3, 2000 || Socorro || LINEAR || — || align=right | 3.2 km || 
|-id=431 bgcolor=#d6d6d6
| 162431 ||  || — || March 27, 2000 || Kitt Peak || Spacewatch || FIR || align=right | 7.7 km || 
|-id=432 bgcolor=#d6d6d6
| 162432 ||  || — || March 25, 2000 || Kitt Peak || Spacewatch || — || align=right | 4.5 km || 
|-id=433 bgcolor=#FFC2E0
| 162433 ||  || — || March 26, 2000 || Socorro || LINEAR || APO || align=right data-sort-value="0.51" | 510 m || 
|-id=434 bgcolor=#d6d6d6
| 162434 ||  || — || March 29, 2000 || Socorro || LINEAR || TIR || align=right | 4.3 km || 
|-id=435 bgcolor=#d6d6d6
| 162435 ||  || — || March 29, 2000 || Kitt Peak || Spacewatch || — || align=right | 5.5 km || 
|-id=436 bgcolor=#d6d6d6
| 162436 ||  || — || March 30, 2000 || Kitt Peak || Spacewatch || 628 || align=right | 2.8 km || 
|-id=437 bgcolor=#E9E9E9
| 162437 ||  || — || March 29, 2000 || Socorro || LINEAR || — || align=right | 5.6 km || 
|-id=438 bgcolor=#FA8072
| 162438 ||  || — || April 5, 2000 || Socorro || LINEAR || — || align=right | 1.4 km || 
|-id=439 bgcolor=#d6d6d6
| 162439 ||  || — || April 3, 2000 || Socorro || LINEAR || TIR || align=right | 4.2 km || 
|-id=440 bgcolor=#E9E9E9
| 162440 ||  || — || April 5, 2000 || Socorro || LINEAR || DOR || align=right | 4.5 km || 
|-id=441 bgcolor=#d6d6d6
| 162441 ||  || — || April 5, 2000 || Socorro || LINEAR || TIR || align=right | 5.4 km || 
|-id=442 bgcolor=#d6d6d6
| 162442 ||  || — || April 5, 2000 || Socorro || LINEAR || — || align=right | 4.9 km || 
|-id=443 bgcolor=#fefefe
| 162443 ||  || — || April 5, 2000 || Socorro || LINEAR || — || align=right | 1.0 km || 
|-id=444 bgcolor=#d6d6d6
| 162444 ||  || — || April 5, 2000 || Socorro || LINEAR || — || align=right | 5.1 km || 
|-id=445 bgcolor=#d6d6d6
| 162445 ||  || — || April 5, 2000 || Socorro || LINEAR || EOS || align=right | 3.6 km || 
|-id=446 bgcolor=#d6d6d6
| 162446 ||  || — || April 3, 2000 || Socorro || LINEAR || — || align=right | 4.5 km || 
|-id=447 bgcolor=#d6d6d6
| 162447 ||  || — || April 3, 2000 || Kitt Peak || Spacewatch || KOR || align=right | 2.0 km || 
|-id=448 bgcolor=#d6d6d6
| 162448 ||  || — || April 6, 2000 || Anderson Mesa || LONEOS || AEG || align=right | 6.1 km || 
|-id=449 bgcolor=#d6d6d6
| 162449 ||  || — || April 6, 2000 || Anderson Mesa || LONEOS || — || align=right | 7.2 km || 
|-id=450 bgcolor=#d6d6d6
| 162450 ||  || — || April 7, 2000 || Socorro || LINEAR || URS || align=right | 7.6 km || 
|-id=451 bgcolor=#d6d6d6
| 162451 ||  || — || April 5, 2000 || Socorro || LINEAR || — || align=right | 3.4 km || 
|-id=452 bgcolor=#FFC2E0
| 162452 ||  || — || April 29, 2000 || Socorro || LINEAR || AMO || align=right data-sort-value="0.78" | 780 m || 
|-id=453 bgcolor=#d6d6d6
| 162453 ||  || — || April 24, 2000 || Kitt Peak || Spacewatch || — || align=right | 5.3 km || 
|-id=454 bgcolor=#d6d6d6
| 162454 ||  || — || April 24, 2000 || Anderson Mesa || LONEOS || URS || align=right | 5.1 km || 
|-id=455 bgcolor=#d6d6d6
| 162455 ||  || — || April 29, 2000 || Socorro || LINEAR || EUP || align=right | 7.4 km || 
|-id=456 bgcolor=#d6d6d6
| 162456 ||  || — || April 27, 2000 || Socorro || LINEAR || — || align=right | 5.8 km || 
|-id=457 bgcolor=#d6d6d6
| 162457 ||  || — || April 27, 2000 || Socorro || LINEAR || TIR || align=right | 5.5 km || 
|-id=458 bgcolor=#fefefe
| 162458 ||  || — || April 29, 2000 || Socorro || LINEAR || — || align=right data-sort-value="0.89" | 890 m || 
|-id=459 bgcolor=#fefefe
| 162459 ||  || — || April 29, 2000 || Socorro || LINEAR || — || align=right | 1.6 km || 
|-id=460 bgcolor=#d6d6d6
| 162460 ||  || — || April 26, 2000 || Anderson Mesa || LONEOS || EOS || align=right | 3.8 km || 
|-id=461 bgcolor=#fefefe
| 162461 ||  || — || April 29, 2000 || Socorro || LINEAR || FLO || align=right data-sort-value="0.87" | 870 m || 
|-id=462 bgcolor=#d6d6d6
| 162462 ||  || — || April 27, 2000 || Anderson Mesa || LONEOS || EOS || align=right | 3.5 km || 
|-id=463 bgcolor=#FFC2E0
| 162463 ||  || — || May 2, 2000 || Socorro || LINEAR || APO +1km || align=right | 1.0 km || 
|-id=464 bgcolor=#d6d6d6
| 162464 ||  || — || May 7, 2000 || Socorro || LINEAR || — || align=right | 3.8 km || 
|-id=465 bgcolor=#fefefe
| 162465 ||  || — || May 7, 2000 || Socorro || LINEAR || — || align=right | 1.0 km || 
|-id=466 bgcolor=#d6d6d6
| 162466 Margon ||  ||  || May 4, 2000 || Apache Point || SDSS || — || align=right | 4.9 km || 
|-id=467 bgcolor=#fefefe
| 162467 ||  || — || May 28, 2000 || Socorro || LINEAR || — || align=right | 1.0 km || 
|-id=468 bgcolor=#d6d6d6
| 162468 ||  || — || May 28, 2000 || Socorro || LINEAR || TIR || align=right | 6.1 km || 
|-id=469 bgcolor=#d6d6d6
| 162469 ||  || — || May 26, 2000 || Kitt Peak || Spacewatch || — || align=right | 7.8 km || 
|-id=470 bgcolor=#FFC2E0
| 162470 ||  || — || May 29, 2000 || Anderson Mesa || LONEOS || APO || align=right data-sort-value="0.48" | 480 m || 
|-id=471 bgcolor=#d6d6d6
| 162471 ||  || — || May 25, 2000 || Anderson Mesa || LONEOS || EUP || align=right | 7.2 km || 
|-id=472 bgcolor=#FFC2E0
| 162472 || 2000 LL || — || June 1, 2000 || Socorro || LINEAR || AMO || align=right data-sort-value="0.55" | 550 m || 
|-id=473 bgcolor=#FA8072
| 162473 ||  || — || June 7, 2000 || Kitt Peak || Spacewatch || — || align=right data-sort-value="0.98" | 980 m || 
|-id=474 bgcolor=#FFC2E0
| 162474 ||  || — || June 7, 2000 || Socorro || LINEAR || APOPHA || align=right data-sort-value="0.74" | 740 m || 
|-id=475 bgcolor=#fefefe
| 162475 ||  || — || June 25, 2000 || Socorro || LINEAR || — || align=right | 1.5 km || 
|-id=476 bgcolor=#fefefe
| 162476 ||  || — || July 6, 2000 || Anderson Mesa || LONEOS || FLO || align=right | 2.1 km || 
|-id=477 bgcolor=#fefefe
| 162477 ||  || — || July 2, 2000 || Kitt Peak || Spacewatch || — || align=right | 1.5 km || 
|-id=478 bgcolor=#fefefe
| 162478 ||  || — || July 31, 2000 || Ondřejov || L. Kotková || — || align=right | 1.2 km || 
|-id=479 bgcolor=#fefefe
| 162479 ||  || — || July 30, 2000 || Socorro || LINEAR || FLO || align=right | 1.3 km || 
|-id=480 bgcolor=#fefefe
| 162480 ||  || — || July 30, 2000 || Socorro || LINEAR || V || align=right data-sort-value="0.99" | 990 m || 
|-id=481 bgcolor=#fefefe
| 162481 ||  || — || July 29, 2000 || Anderson Mesa || LONEOS || — || align=right | 1.3 km || 
|-id=482 bgcolor=#fefefe
| 162482 ||  || — || July 29, 2000 || Anderson Mesa || LONEOS || — || align=right | 1.2 km || 
|-id=483 bgcolor=#FFC2E0
| 162483 ||  || — || August 4, 2000 || Socorro || LINEAR || ATE +1kmmoon || align=right data-sort-value="0.91" | 910 m || 
|-id=484 bgcolor=#fefefe
| 162484 ||  || — || August 1, 2000 || Socorro || LINEAR || V || align=right | 1.3 km || 
|-id=485 bgcolor=#fefefe
| 162485 ||  || — || August 1, 2000 || Socorro || LINEAR || — || align=right | 1.5 km || 
|-id=486 bgcolor=#fefefe
| 162486 ||  || — || August 1, 2000 || Socorro || LINEAR || — || align=right | 1.3 km || 
|-id=487 bgcolor=#fefefe
| 162487 ||  || — || August 1, 2000 || Socorro || LINEAR || — || align=right | 1.3 km || 
|-id=488 bgcolor=#fefefe
| 162488 ||  || — || August 1, 2000 || Socorro || LINEAR || — || align=right | 1.4 km || 
|-id=489 bgcolor=#fefefe
| 162489 ||  || — || August 1, 2000 || Socorro || LINEAR || — || align=right | 1.5 km || 
|-id=490 bgcolor=#fefefe
| 162490 ||  || — || August 1, 2000 || Socorro || LINEAR || — || align=right | 1.6 km || 
|-id=491 bgcolor=#fefefe
| 162491 ||  || — || August 2, 2000 || Socorro || LINEAR || — || align=right | 1.3 km || 
|-id=492 bgcolor=#fefefe
| 162492 ||  || — || August 24, 2000 || Socorro || LINEAR || — || align=right | 4.0 km || 
|-id=493 bgcolor=#fefefe
| 162493 ||  || — || August 25, 2000 || Višnjan Observatory || K. Korlević, M. Jurić || FLO || align=right | 1.5 km || 
|-id=494 bgcolor=#fefefe
| 162494 ||  || — || August 25, 2000 || Višnjan Observatory || K. Korlević, M. Jurić || — || align=right | 1.5 km || 
|-id=495 bgcolor=#fefefe
| 162495 ||  || — || August 24, 2000 || Socorro || LINEAR || FLO || align=right | 1.2 km || 
|-id=496 bgcolor=#fefefe
| 162496 ||  || — || August 26, 2000 || Ondřejov || P. Pravec, P. Kušnirák || V || align=right | 1.4 km || 
|-id=497 bgcolor=#fefefe
| 162497 ||  || — || August 24, 2000 || Socorro || LINEAR || FLO || align=right | 1.5 km || 
|-id=498 bgcolor=#fefefe
| 162498 ||  || — || August 26, 2000 || Socorro || LINEAR || FLO || align=right | 1.1 km || 
|-id=499 bgcolor=#fefefe
| 162499 ||  || — || August 26, 2000 || Višnjan Observatory || K. Korlević, M. Jurić || — || align=right | 1.5 km || 
|-id=500 bgcolor=#fefefe
| 162500 ||  || — || August 24, 2000 || Socorro || LINEAR || FLO || align=right | 1.4 km || 
|}

162501–162600 

|-bgcolor=#fefefe
| 162501 ||  || — || August 24, 2000 || Socorro || LINEAR || — || align=right | 1.8 km || 
|-id=502 bgcolor=#fefefe
| 162502 ||  || — || August 24, 2000 || Socorro || LINEAR || — || align=right | 1.6 km || 
|-id=503 bgcolor=#fefefe
| 162503 ||  || — || August 24, 2000 || Socorro || LINEAR || V || align=right | 1.2 km || 
|-id=504 bgcolor=#fefefe
| 162504 ||  || — || August 24, 2000 || Socorro || LINEAR || V || align=right | 1.3 km || 
|-id=505 bgcolor=#fefefe
| 162505 ||  || — || August 24, 2000 || Socorro || LINEAR || V || align=right | 1.2 km || 
|-id=506 bgcolor=#fefefe
| 162506 ||  || — || August 24, 2000 || Socorro || LINEAR || — || align=right | 1.3 km || 
|-id=507 bgcolor=#fefefe
| 162507 ||  || — || August 26, 2000 || Socorro || LINEAR || — || align=right | 1.5 km || 
|-id=508 bgcolor=#fefefe
| 162508 ||  || — || August 28, 2000 || Socorro || LINEAR || — || align=right | 1.9 km || 
|-id=509 bgcolor=#fefefe
| 162509 ||  || — || August 28, 2000 || Socorro || LINEAR || NYS || align=right | 2.5 km || 
|-id=510 bgcolor=#FFC2E0
| 162510 ||  || — || August 28, 2000 || Socorro || LINEAR || APO +1kmPHA || align=right | 1.4 km || 
|-id=511 bgcolor=#fefefe
| 162511 ||  || — || August 24, 2000 || Socorro || LINEAR || — || align=right | 1.3 km || 
|-id=512 bgcolor=#fefefe
| 162512 ||  || — || August 24, 2000 || Socorro || LINEAR || — || align=right | 1.3 km || 
|-id=513 bgcolor=#fefefe
| 162513 ||  || — || August 25, 2000 || Socorro || LINEAR || — || align=right | 1.6 km || 
|-id=514 bgcolor=#fefefe
| 162514 ||  || — || August 28, 2000 || Socorro || LINEAR || — || align=right | 1.4 km || 
|-id=515 bgcolor=#fefefe
| 162515 ||  || — || August 28, 2000 || Socorro || LINEAR || — || align=right | 1.9 km || 
|-id=516 bgcolor=#fefefe
| 162516 ||  || — || August 29, 2000 || Socorro || LINEAR || — || align=right | 1.4 km || 
|-id=517 bgcolor=#d6d6d6
| 162517 ||  || — || August 29, 2000 || Socorro || LINEAR || EOS || align=right | 3.2 km || 
|-id=518 bgcolor=#fefefe
| 162518 ||  || — || August 29, 2000 || Socorro || LINEAR || V || align=right | 1.1 km || 
|-id=519 bgcolor=#fefefe
| 162519 ||  || — || August 24, 2000 || Socorro || LINEAR || NYS || align=right | 2.2 km || 
|-id=520 bgcolor=#fefefe
| 162520 ||  || — || August 25, 2000 || Socorro || LINEAR || V || align=right | 1.2 km || 
|-id=521 bgcolor=#fefefe
| 162521 ||  || — || August 25, 2000 || Socorro || LINEAR || V || align=right | 1.3 km || 
|-id=522 bgcolor=#fefefe
| 162522 ||  || — || August 25, 2000 || Socorro || LINEAR || — || align=right | 1.5 km || 
|-id=523 bgcolor=#fefefe
| 162523 ||  || — || August 31, 2000 || Socorro || LINEAR || V || align=right | 1.1 km || 
|-id=524 bgcolor=#fefefe
| 162524 ||  || — || August 31, 2000 || Socorro || LINEAR || V || align=right | 1.2 km || 
|-id=525 bgcolor=#fefefe
| 162525 ||  || — || August 24, 2000 || Socorro || LINEAR || — || align=right | 1.6 km || 
|-id=526 bgcolor=#fefefe
| 162526 ||  || — || August 25, 2000 || Socorro || LINEAR || FLO || align=right | 1.2 km || 
|-id=527 bgcolor=#fefefe
| 162527 ||  || — || August 26, 2000 || Socorro || LINEAR || — || align=right | 1.5 km || 
|-id=528 bgcolor=#fefefe
| 162528 ||  || — || August 26, 2000 || Socorro || LINEAR || FLO || align=right | 1.9 km || 
|-id=529 bgcolor=#fefefe
| 162529 ||  || — || August 31, 2000 || Socorro || LINEAR || NYS || align=right | 1.8 km || 
|-id=530 bgcolor=#fefefe
| 162530 ||  || — || August 31, 2000 || Socorro || LINEAR || — || align=right | 1.8 km || 
|-id=531 bgcolor=#fefefe
| 162531 ||  || — || August 31, 2000 || Socorro || LINEAR || V || align=right | 1.5 km || 
|-id=532 bgcolor=#fefefe
| 162532 ||  || — || August 31, 2000 || Socorro || LINEAR || FLO || align=right | 1.3 km || 
|-id=533 bgcolor=#fefefe
| 162533 ||  || — || August 31, 2000 || Socorro || LINEAR || — || align=right | 1.5 km || 
|-id=534 bgcolor=#fefefe
| 162534 ||  || — || August 31, 2000 || Socorro || LINEAR || — || align=right | 1.5 km || 
|-id=535 bgcolor=#fefefe
| 162535 ||  || — || August 31, 2000 || Socorro || LINEAR || — || align=right | 1.5 km || 
|-id=536 bgcolor=#fefefe
| 162536 ||  || — || August 31, 2000 || Socorro || LINEAR || — || align=right | 1.5 km || 
|-id=537 bgcolor=#fefefe
| 162537 ||  || — || August 31, 2000 || Socorro || LINEAR || FLO || align=right | 1.4 km || 
|-id=538 bgcolor=#fefefe
| 162538 ||  || — || August 31, 2000 || Socorro || LINEAR || FLO || align=right | 1.2 km || 
|-id=539 bgcolor=#fefefe
| 162539 ||  || — || August 31, 2000 || Socorro || LINEAR || — || align=right | 1.5 km || 
|-id=540 bgcolor=#fefefe
| 162540 ||  || — || August 31, 2000 || Socorro || LINEAR || FLO || align=right | 1.7 km || 
|-id=541 bgcolor=#fefefe
| 162541 ||  || — || August 31, 2000 || Socorro || LINEAR || — || align=right | 1.2 km || 
|-id=542 bgcolor=#fefefe
| 162542 ||  || — || August 31, 2000 || Socorro || LINEAR || V || align=right data-sort-value="0.88" | 880 m || 
|-id=543 bgcolor=#fefefe
| 162543 ||  || — || August 31, 2000 || Socorro || LINEAR || — || align=right | 1.1 km || 
|-id=544 bgcolor=#fefefe
| 162544 ||  || — || August 26, 2000 || Socorro || LINEAR || FLO || align=right | 1.2 km || 
|-id=545 bgcolor=#fefefe
| 162545 ||  || — || August 31, 2000 || Socorro || LINEAR || — || align=right | 1.3 km || 
|-id=546 bgcolor=#fefefe
| 162546 ||  || — || August 31, 2000 || Socorro || LINEAR || NYS || align=right | 1.5 km || 
|-id=547 bgcolor=#fefefe
| 162547 ||  || — || August 31, 2000 || Socorro || LINEAR || — || align=right | 1.6 km || 
|-id=548 bgcolor=#fefefe
| 162548 ||  || — || August 31, 2000 || Socorro || LINEAR || NYS || align=right data-sort-value="0.87" | 870 m || 
|-id=549 bgcolor=#fefefe
| 162549 ||  || — || August 31, 2000 || Socorro || LINEAR || ERI || align=right | 2.5 km || 
|-id=550 bgcolor=#fefefe
| 162550 ||  || — || August 31, 2000 || Socorro || LINEAR || NYS || align=right | 1.1 km || 
|-id=551 bgcolor=#FA8072
| 162551 ||  || — || August 31, 2000 || Socorro || LINEAR || — || align=right | 1.9 km || 
|-id=552 bgcolor=#fefefe
| 162552 ||  || — || August 21, 2000 || Anderson Mesa || LONEOS || — || align=right | 1.9 km || 
|-id=553 bgcolor=#fefefe
| 162553 ||  || — || September 3, 2000 || Socorro || LINEAR || — || align=right | 1.8 km || 
|-id=554 bgcolor=#fefefe
| 162554 ||  || — || September 1, 2000 || Socorro || LINEAR || V || align=right | 1.3 km || 
|-id=555 bgcolor=#fefefe
| 162555 ||  || — || September 1, 2000 || Socorro || LINEAR || — || align=right | 1.5 km || 
|-id=556 bgcolor=#fefefe
| 162556 ||  || — || September 1, 2000 || Socorro || LINEAR || V || align=right | 1.3 km || 
|-id=557 bgcolor=#fefefe
| 162557 ||  || — || September 1, 2000 || Socorro || LINEAR || — || align=right | 2.0 km || 
|-id=558 bgcolor=#fefefe
| 162558 ||  || — || September 1, 2000 || Socorro || LINEAR || — || align=right | 1.5 km || 
|-id=559 bgcolor=#fefefe
| 162559 ||  || — || September 1, 2000 || Socorro || LINEAR || FLO || align=right | 1.3 km || 
|-id=560 bgcolor=#fefefe
| 162560 ||  || — || September 1, 2000 || Socorro || LINEAR || FLO || align=right | 1.2 km || 
|-id=561 bgcolor=#fefefe
| 162561 ||  || — || September 1, 2000 || Socorro || LINEAR || — || align=right | 1.6 km || 
|-id=562 bgcolor=#fefefe
| 162562 ||  || — || September 1, 2000 || Socorro || LINEAR || — || align=right | 1.0 km || 
|-id=563 bgcolor=#fefefe
| 162563 ||  || — || September 1, 2000 || Socorro || LINEAR || — || align=right | 2.7 km || 
|-id=564 bgcolor=#fefefe
| 162564 ||  || — || September 1, 2000 || Socorro || LINEAR || — || align=right | 1.9 km || 
|-id=565 bgcolor=#fefefe
| 162565 ||  || — || September 1, 2000 || Socorro || LINEAR || — || align=right | 1.8 km || 
|-id=566 bgcolor=#FFC2E0
| 162566 ||  || — || September 1, 2000 || Socorro || LINEAR || AMO +1km || align=right | 4.3 km || 
|-id=567 bgcolor=#FFC2E0
| 162567 ||  || — || September 3, 2000 || Socorro || LINEAR || APOPHA || align=right data-sort-value="0.34" | 340 m || 
|-id=568 bgcolor=#fefefe
| 162568 ||  || — || September 5, 2000 || Kvistaberg || UDAS || NYS || align=right | 2.5 km || 
|-id=569 bgcolor=#fefefe
| 162569 ||  || — || September 3, 2000 || Socorro || LINEAR || V || align=right | 1.2 km || 
|-id=570 bgcolor=#fefefe
| 162570 ||  || — || September 3, 2000 || Socorro || LINEAR || — || align=right | 1.9 km || 
|-id=571 bgcolor=#fefefe
| 162571 ||  || — || September 7, 2000 || Kitt Peak || Spacewatch || — || align=right | 1.2 km || 
|-id=572 bgcolor=#fefefe
| 162572 ||  || — || September 6, 2000 || Socorro || LINEAR || FLO || align=right | 1.4 km || 
|-id=573 bgcolor=#fefefe
| 162573 ||  || — || September 3, 2000 || Socorro || LINEAR || FLO || align=right data-sort-value="0.88" | 880 m || 
|-id=574 bgcolor=#fefefe
| 162574 ||  || — || September 1, 2000 || Socorro || LINEAR || NYS || align=right | 1.1 km || 
|-id=575 bgcolor=#fefefe
| 162575 ||  || — || September 2, 2000 || Anderson Mesa || LONEOS || — || align=right | 1.2 km || 
|-id=576 bgcolor=#fefefe
| 162576 ||  || — || September 2, 2000 || Anderson Mesa || LONEOS || FLO || align=right | 1.3 km || 
|-id=577 bgcolor=#fefefe
| 162577 ||  || — || September 3, 2000 || Socorro || LINEAR || V || align=right | 1.3 km || 
|-id=578 bgcolor=#fefefe
| 162578 ||  || — || September 3, 2000 || Socorro || LINEAR || FLO || align=right | 1.4 km || 
|-id=579 bgcolor=#fefefe
| 162579 ||  || — || September 20, 2000 || Socorro || LINEAR || — || align=right | 2.0 km || 
|-id=580 bgcolor=#fefefe
| 162580 ||  || — || September 21, 2000 || Socorro || LINEAR || — || align=right | 1.6 km || 
|-id=581 bgcolor=#FFC2E0
| 162581 ||  || — || September 23, 2000 || Socorro || LINEAR || AMO || align=right data-sort-value="0.71" | 710 m || 
|-id=582 bgcolor=#fefefe
| 162582 ||  || — || September 20, 2000 || Socorro || LINEAR || FLO || align=right | 1.6 km || 
|-id=583 bgcolor=#fefefe
| 162583 ||  || — || September 23, 2000 || Socorro || LINEAR || — || align=right | 1.8 km || 
|-id=584 bgcolor=#fefefe
| 162584 ||  || — || September 24, 2000 || Socorro || LINEAR || NYS || align=right data-sort-value="0.79" | 790 m || 
|-id=585 bgcolor=#fefefe
| 162585 ||  || — || September 24, 2000 || Socorro || LINEAR || NYS || align=right | 1.1 km || 
|-id=586 bgcolor=#fefefe
| 162586 ||  || — || September 24, 2000 || Socorro || LINEAR || — || align=right | 1.7 km || 
|-id=587 bgcolor=#fefefe
| 162587 ||  || — || September 24, 2000 || Socorro || LINEAR || — || align=right | 1.5 km || 
|-id=588 bgcolor=#fefefe
| 162588 ||  || — || September 24, 2000 || Socorro || LINEAR || NYS || align=right | 1.2 km || 
|-id=589 bgcolor=#fefefe
| 162589 ||  || — || September 24, 2000 || Socorro || LINEAR || NYS || align=right | 1.2 km || 
|-id=590 bgcolor=#fefefe
| 162590 ||  || — || September 24, 2000 || Socorro || LINEAR || — || align=right | 1.0 km || 
|-id=591 bgcolor=#fefefe
| 162591 ||  || — || September 24, 2000 || Socorro || LINEAR || FLO || align=right data-sort-value="0.99" | 990 m || 
|-id=592 bgcolor=#fefefe
| 162592 ||  || — || September 24, 2000 || Bergisch Gladbach || W. Bickel || V || align=right | 1.2 km || 
|-id=593 bgcolor=#fefefe
| 162593 ||  || — || September 23, 2000 || Socorro || LINEAR || — || align=right | 1.8 km || 
|-id=594 bgcolor=#fefefe
| 162594 ||  || — || September 24, 2000 || Socorro || LINEAR || — || align=right | 1.3 km || 
|-id=595 bgcolor=#fefefe
| 162595 ||  || — || September 24, 2000 || Socorro || LINEAR || — || align=right | 1.6 km || 
|-id=596 bgcolor=#fefefe
| 162596 ||  || — || September 24, 2000 || Socorro || LINEAR || — || align=right | 1.1 km || 
|-id=597 bgcolor=#fefefe
| 162597 ||  || — || September 24, 2000 || Socorro || LINEAR || — || align=right | 1.4 km || 
|-id=598 bgcolor=#fefefe
| 162598 ||  || — || September 24, 2000 || Socorro || LINEAR || — || align=right | 1.1 km || 
|-id=599 bgcolor=#fefefe
| 162599 ||  || — || September 24, 2000 || Socorro || LINEAR || FLO || align=right | 2.2 km || 
|-id=600 bgcolor=#fefefe
| 162600 ||  || — || September 24, 2000 || Socorro || LINEAR || V || align=right | 1.3 km || 
|}

162601–162700 

|-bgcolor=#fefefe
| 162601 ||  || — || September 24, 2000 || Socorro || LINEAR || V || align=right | 1.2 km || 
|-id=602 bgcolor=#fefefe
| 162602 ||  || — || September 24, 2000 || Socorro || LINEAR || — || align=right | 1.4 km || 
|-id=603 bgcolor=#fefefe
| 162603 ||  || — || September 24, 2000 || Socorro || LINEAR || — || align=right | 1.4 km || 
|-id=604 bgcolor=#fefefe
| 162604 ||  || — || September 24, 2000 || Socorro || LINEAR || — || align=right | 1.5 km || 
|-id=605 bgcolor=#fefefe
| 162605 ||  || — || September 24, 2000 || Socorro || LINEAR || — || align=right | 1.1 km || 
|-id=606 bgcolor=#fefefe
| 162606 ||  || — || September 24, 2000 || Socorro || LINEAR || V || align=right data-sort-value="0.97" | 970 m || 
|-id=607 bgcolor=#fefefe
| 162607 ||  || — || September 24, 2000 || Socorro || LINEAR || — || align=right | 1.1 km || 
|-id=608 bgcolor=#fefefe
| 162608 ||  || — || September 22, 2000 || Socorro || LINEAR || — || align=right | 3.3 km || 
|-id=609 bgcolor=#fefefe
| 162609 ||  || — || September 23, 2000 || Socorro || LINEAR || KLI || align=right | 2.9 km || 
|-id=610 bgcolor=#fefefe
| 162610 ||  || — || September 23, 2000 || Socorro || LINEAR || NYS || align=right | 1.1 km || 
|-id=611 bgcolor=#fefefe
| 162611 ||  || — || September 23, 2000 || Socorro || LINEAR || — || align=right | 1.5 km || 
|-id=612 bgcolor=#fefefe
| 162612 ||  || — || September 23, 2000 || Socorro || LINEAR || — || align=right | 1.4 km || 
|-id=613 bgcolor=#fefefe
| 162613 ||  || — || September 24, 2000 || Socorro || LINEAR || FLO || align=right | 1.9 km || 
|-id=614 bgcolor=#fefefe
| 162614 ||  || — || September 24, 2000 || Socorro || LINEAR || NYS || align=right | 1.3 km || 
|-id=615 bgcolor=#fefefe
| 162615 ||  || — || September 24, 2000 || Socorro || LINEAR || — || align=right | 1.9 km || 
|-id=616 bgcolor=#fefefe
| 162616 ||  || — || September 24, 2000 || Socorro || LINEAR || NYS || align=right | 1.1 km || 
|-id=617 bgcolor=#fefefe
| 162617 ||  || — || September 24, 2000 || Socorro || LINEAR || — || align=right | 1.2 km || 
|-id=618 bgcolor=#fefefe
| 162618 ||  || — || September 24, 2000 || Socorro || LINEAR || NYS || align=right | 2.3 km || 
|-id=619 bgcolor=#fefefe
| 162619 ||  || — || September 24, 2000 || Socorro || LINEAR || — || align=right | 1.7 km || 
|-id=620 bgcolor=#fefefe
| 162620 ||  || — || September 24, 2000 || Socorro || LINEAR || — || align=right | 1.4 km || 
|-id=621 bgcolor=#fefefe
| 162621 ||  || — || September 24, 2000 || Socorro || LINEAR || NYS || align=right | 1.2 km || 
|-id=622 bgcolor=#fefefe
| 162622 ||  || — || September 24, 2000 || Socorro || LINEAR || NYS || align=right | 1.1 km || 
|-id=623 bgcolor=#fefefe
| 162623 ||  || — || September 24, 2000 || Socorro || LINEAR || — || align=right | 1.6 km || 
|-id=624 bgcolor=#fefefe
| 162624 ||  || — || September 24, 2000 || Socorro || LINEAR || NYS || align=right | 1.2 km || 
|-id=625 bgcolor=#fefefe
| 162625 ||  || — || September 24, 2000 || Socorro || LINEAR || — || align=right | 1.9 km || 
|-id=626 bgcolor=#fefefe
| 162626 ||  || — || September 26, 2000 || Socorro || LINEAR || NYS || align=right data-sort-value="0.91" | 910 m || 
|-id=627 bgcolor=#fefefe
| 162627 ||  || — || September 23, 2000 || Socorro || LINEAR || V || align=right | 1.3 km || 
|-id=628 bgcolor=#fefefe
| 162628 ||  || — || September 23, 2000 || Socorro || LINEAR || — || align=right | 2.7 km || 
|-id=629 bgcolor=#fefefe
| 162629 ||  || — || September 23, 2000 || Socorro || LINEAR || — || align=right | 1.7 km || 
|-id=630 bgcolor=#fefefe
| 162630 ||  || — || September 24, 2000 || Socorro || LINEAR || NYS || align=right | 1.1 km || 
|-id=631 bgcolor=#fefefe
| 162631 ||  || — || September 24, 2000 || Socorro || LINEAR || NYS || align=right data-sort-value="0.92" | 920 m || 
|-id=632 bgcolor=#fefefe
| 162632 ||  || — || September 24, 2000 || Socorro || LINEAR || FLO || align=right | 1.1 km || 
|-id=633 bgcolor=#fefefe
| 162633 ||  || — || September 24, 2000 || Socorro || LINEAR || — || align=right | 1.8 km || 
|-id=634 bgcolor=#fefefe
| 162634 ||  || — || September 27, 2000 || Socorro || LINEAR || — || align=right | 3.0 km || 
|-id=635 bgcolor=#FFC2E0
| 162635 ||  || — || September 27, 2000 || Socorro || LINEAR || AMO +1km || align=right | 1.8 km || 
|-id=636 bgcolor=#fefefe
| 162636 ||  || — || September 23, 2000 || Socorro || LINEAR || V || align=right | 1.4 km || 
|-id=637 bgcolor=#fefefe
| 162637 ||  || — || September 28, 2000 || Socorro || LINEAR || — || align=right | 2.5 km || 
|-id=638 bgcolor=#fefefe
| 162638 ||  || — || September 28, 2000 || Socorro || LINEAR || V || align=right | 1.1 km || 
|-id=639 bgcolor=#fefefe
| 162639 ||  || — || September 28, 2000 || Socorro || LINEAR || — || align=right | 1.6 km || 
|-id=640 bgcolor=#fefefe
| 162640 ||  || — || September 28, 2000 || Socorro || LINEAR || — || align=right | 3.7 km || 
|-id=641 bgcolor=#fefefe
| 162641 ||  || — || September 28, 2000 || Socorro || LINEAR || — || align=right | 1.6 km || 
|-id=642 bgcolor=#fefefe
| 162642 ||  || — || September 24, 2000 || Socorro || LINEAR || FLO || align=right | 1.3 km || 
|-id=643 bgcolor=#fefefe
| 162643 ||  || — || September 24, 2000 || Socorro || LINEAR || V || align=right | 1.0 km || 
|-id=644 bgcolor=#fefefe
| 162644 ||  || — || September 24, 2000 || Socorro || LINEAR || — || align=right | 2.8 km || 
|-id=645 bgcolor=#fefefe
| 162645 ||  || — || September 24, 2000 || Socorro || LINEAR || NYS || align=right | 2.1 km || 
|-id=646 bgcolor=#fefefe
| 162646 ||  || — || September 24, 2000 || Socorro || LINEAR || V || align=right | 1.1 km || 
|-id=647 bgcolor=#fefefe
| 162647 ||  || — || September 26, 2000 || Socorro || LINEAR || FLO || align=right | 1.2 km || 
|-id=648 bgcolor=#fefefe
| 162648 ||  || — || September 26, 2000 || Socorro || LINEAR || — || align=right | 1.8 km || 
|-id=649 bgcolor=#fefefe
| 162649 ||  || — || September 26, 2000 || Socorro || LINEAR || V || align=right | 1.2 km || 
|-id=650 bgcolor=#fefefe
| 162650 ||  || — || September 27, 2000 || Socorro || LINEAR || — || align=right | 1.6 km || 
|-id=651 bgcolor=#fefefe
| 162651 ||  || — || September 28, 2000 || Socorro || LINEAR || — || align=right | 3.4 km || 
|-id=652 bgcolor=#fefefe
| 162652 ||  || — || September 28, 2000 || Socorro || LINEAR || NYS || align=right | 1.2 km || 
|-id=653 bgcolor=#fefefe
| 162653 ||  || — || September 28, 2000 || Socorro || LINEAR || MAS || align=right | 1.2 km || 
|-id=654 bgcolor=#fefefe
| 162654 ||  || — || September 27, 2000 || Socorro || LINEAR || PHO || align=right | 4.7 km || 
|-id=655 bgcolor=#fefefe
| 162655 ||  || — || September 24, 2000 || Socorro || LINEAR || V || align=right | 1.1 km || 
|-id=656 bgcolor=#fefefe
| 162656 ||  || — || September 24, 2000 || Socorro || LINEAR || — || align=right | 1.1 km || 
|-id=657 bgcolor=#fefefe
| 162657 ||  || — || September 24, 2000 || Socorro || LINEAR || NYS || align=right | 2.7 km || 
|-id=658 bgcolor=#fefefe
| 162658 ||  || — || September 24, 2000 || Socorro || LINEAR || V || align=right data-sort-value="0.91" | 910 m || 
|-id=659 bgcolor=#fefefe
| 162659 ||  || — || September 24, 2000 || Socorro || LINEAR || — || align=right | 1.4 km || 
|-id=660 bgcolor=#fefefe
| 162660 ||  || — || September 24, 2000 || Socorro || LINEAR || NYS || align=right data-sort-value="0.94" | 940 m || 
|-id=661 bgcolor=#fefefe
| 162661 ||  || — || September 24, 2000 || Socorro || LINEAR || — || align=right | 1.5 km || 
|-id=662 bgcolor=#fefefe
| 162662 ||  || — || September 24, 2000 || Socorro || LINEAR || FLO || align=right | 1.3 km || 
|-id=663 bgcolor=#fefefe
| 162663 ||  || — || September 24, 2000 || Socorro || LINEAR || NYS || align=right | 1.0 km || 
|-id=664 bgcolor=#fefefe
| 162664 ||  || — || September 24, 2000 || Socorro || LINEAR || — || align=right | 1.7 km || 
|-id=665 bgcolor=#fefefe
| 162665 ||  || — || September 24, 2000 || Socorro || LINEAR || — || align=right | 1.7 km || 
|-id=666 bgcolor=#fefefe
| 162666 ||  || — || September 26, 2000 || Socorro || LINEAR || — || align=right | 1.5 km || 
|-id=667 bgcolor=#fefefe
| 162667 ||  || — || September 27, 2000 || Socorro || LINEAR || — || align=right | 1.4 km || 
|-id=668 bgcolor=#fefefe
| 162668 ||  || — || September 27, 2000 || Socorro || LINEAR || NYS || align=right | 1.0 km || 
|-id=669 bgcolor=#fefefe
| 162669 ||  || — || September 30, 2000 || Socorro || LINEAR || — || align=right | 1.3 km || 
|-id=670 bgcolor=#fefefe
| 162670 ||  || — || September 30, 2000 || Socorro || LINEAR || — || align=right | 1.8 km || 
|-id=671 bgcolor=#fefefe
| 162671 ||  || — || September 26, 2000 || Socorro || LINEAR || — || align=right | 4.4 km || 
|-id=672 bgcolor=#fefefe
| 162672 ||  || — || September 28, 2000 || Socorro || LINEAR || — || align=right | 1.5 km || 
|-id=673 bgcolor=#fefefe
| 162673 ||  || — || September 30, 2000 || Socorro || LINEAR || V || align=right | 1.3 km || 
|-id=674 bgcolor=#fefefe
| 162674 ||  || — || September 30, 2000 || Socorro || LINEAR || — || align=right | 3.8 km || 
|-id=675 bgcolor=#fefefe
| 162675 ||  || — || September 30, 2000 || Socorro || LINEAR || — || align=right | 1.7 km || 
|-id=676 bgcolor=#fefefe
| 162676 ||  || — || September 24, 2000 || Anderson Mesa || LONEOS || NYS || align=right data-sort-value="0.81" | 810 m || 
|-id=677 bgcolor=#fefefe
| 162677 ||  || — || September 24, 2000 || Socorro || LINEAR || NYS || align=right | 1.1 km || 
|-id=678 bgcolor=#fefefe
| 162678 ||  || — || September 30, 2000 || Socorro || LINEAR || V || align=right | 1.1 km || 
|-id=679 bgcolor=#FFC2E0
| 162679 ||  || — || October 1, 2000 || Socorro || LINEAR || APO +1km || align=right data-sort-value="0.93" | 930 m || 
|-id=680 bgcolor=#fefefe
| 162680 ||  || — || October 1, 2000 || Socorro || LINEAR || — || align=right | 2.0 km || 
|-id=681 bgcolor=#fefefe
| 162681 ||  || — || October 1, 2000 || Socorro || LINEAR || — || align=right | 1.2 km || 
|-id=682 bgcolor=#fefefe
| 162682 ||  || — || October 1, 2000 || Socorro || LINEAR || NYS || align=right | 1.1 km || 
|-id=683 bgcolor=#fefefe
| 162683 ||  || — || October 1, 2000 || Socorro || LINEAR || — || align=right | 1.5 km || 
|-id=684 bgcolor=#fefefe
| 162684 ||  || — || October 1, 2000 || Socorro || LINEAR || ERI || align=right | 2.4 km || 
|-id=685 bgcolor=#fefefe
| 162685 ||  || — || October 2, 2000 || Anderson Mesa || LONEOS || — || align=right | 2.7 km || 
|-id=686 bgcolor=#fefefe
| 162686 ||  || — || October 1, 2000 || Socorro || LINEAR || — || align=right | 1.6 km || 
|-id=687 bgcolor=#FFC2E0
| 162687 ||  || — || October 18, 2000 || Socorro || LINEAR || APOPHA || align=right data-sort-value="0.60" | 600 m || 
|-id=688 bgcolor=#fefefe
| 162688 ||  || — || October 24, 2000 || Socorro || LINEAR || — || align=right | 1.6 km || 
|-id=689 bgcolor=#fefefe
| 162689 ||  || — || October 24, 2000 || Socorro || LINEAR || NYS || align=right | 1.3 km || 
|-id=690 bgcolor=#fefefe
| 162690 ||  || — || October 24, 2000 || Socorro || LINEAR || — || align=right | 1.6 km || 
|-id=691 bgcolor=#fefefe
| 162691 ||  || — || October 24, 2000 || Socorro || LINEAR || — || align=right | 1.2 km || 
|-id=692 bgcolor=#fefefe
| 162692 ||  || — || October 24, 2000 || Socorro || LINEAR || — || align=right | 1.3 km || 
|-id=693 bgcolor=#fefefe
| 162693 ||  || — || October 24, 2000 || Socorro || LINEAR || FLO || align=right | 2.5 km || 
|-id=694 bgcolor=#FFC2E0
| 162694 ||  || — || October 25, 2000 || Socorro || LINEAR || ATE || align=right data-sort-value="0.43" | 430 m || 
|-id=695 bgcolor=#FFC2E0
| 162695 ||  || — || October 25, 2000 || Socorro || LINEAR || APOPHAcritical || align=right data-sort-value="0.34" | 340 m || 
|-id=696 bgcolor=#fefefe
| 162696 ||  || — || October 24, 2000 || Socorro || LINEAR || MAS || align=right | 1.3 km || 
|-id=697 bgcolor=#fefefe
| 162697 ||  || — || October 25, 2000 || Socorro || LINEAR || V || align=right | 1.3 km || 
|-id=698 bgcolor=#FFC2E0
| 162698 ||  || — || October 29, 2000 || Socorro || LINEAR || AMO +1km || align=right data-sort-value="0.81" | 810 m || 
|-id=699 bgcolor=#fefefe
| 162699 ||  || — || October 29, 2000 || Ondřejov || P. Kušnirák, P. Pravec || — || align=right | 1.3 km || 
|-id=700 bgcolor=#fefefe
| 162700 ||  || — || October 24, 2000 || Socorro || LINEAR || NYS || align=right | 1.1 km || 
|}

162701–162800 

|-bgcolor=#fefefe
| 162701 ||  || — || October 24, 2000 || Socorro || LINEAR || MAS || align=right | 1.3 km || 
|-id=702 bgcolor=#fefefe
| 162702 ||  || — || October 24, 2000 || Socorro || LINEAR || — || align=right | 1.5 km || 
|-id=703 bgcolor=#fefefe
| 162703 ||  || — || October 24, 2000 || Socorro || LINEAR || NYS || align=right | 1.2 km || 
|-id=704 bgcolor=#fefefe
| 162704 ||  || — || October 25, 2000 || Socorro || LINEAR || — || align=right | 1.5 km || 
|-id=705 bgcolor=#d6d6d6
| 162705 ||  || — || October 25, 2000 || Socorro || LINEAR || 3:2 || align=right | 7.4 km || 
|-id=706 bgcolor=#fefefe
| 162706 ||  || — || October 25, 2000 || Socorro || LINEAR || — || align=right | 1.9 km || 
|-id=707 bgcolor=#fefefe
| 162707 ||  || — || October 25, 2000 || Socorro || LINEAR || — || align=right | 1.5 km || 
|-id=708 bgcolor=#fefefe
| 162708 ||  || — || October 25, 2000 || Socorro || LINEAR || V || align=right | 1.2 km || 
|-id=709 bgcolor=#fefefe
| 162709 ||  || — || October 25, 2000 || Socorro || LINEAR || V || align=right | 1.6 km || 
|-id=710 bgcolor=#fefefe
| 162710 ||  || — || October 25, 2000 || Socorro || LINEAR || — || align=right | 1.5 km || 
|-id=711 bgcolor=#fefefe
| 162711 ||  || — || October 24, 2000 || Socorro || LINEAR || — || align=right | 2.0 km || 
|-id=712 bgcolor=#fefefe
| 162712 ||  || — || October 31, 2000 || Socorro || LINEAR || NYS || align=right data-sort-value="0.92" | 920 m || 
|-id=713 bgcolor=#fefefe
| 162713 ||  || — || October 25, 2000 || Socorro || LINEAR || — || align=right | 1.8 km || 
|-id=714 bgcolor=#fefefe
| 162714 ||  || — || October 25, 2000 || Socorro || LINEAR || — || align=right | 1.9 km || 
|-id=715 bgcolor=#fefefe
| 162715 ||  || — || October 25, 2000 || Socorro || LINEAR || — || align=right | 1.4 km || 
|-id=716 bgcolor=#fefefe
| 162716 ||  || — || October 25, 2000 || Socorro || LINEAR || V || align=right | 1.4 km || 
|-id=717 bgcolor=#fefefe
| 162717 ||  || — || October 25, 2000 || Socorro || LINEAR || — || align=right | 3.0 km || 
|-id=718 bgcolor=#fefefe
| 162718 ||  || — || October 25, 2000 || Socorro || LINEAR || V || align=right | 1.6 km || 
|-id=719 bgcolor=#fefefe
| 162719 ||  || — || October 25, 2000 || Socorro || LINEAR || — || align=right | 1.6 km || 
|-id=720 bgcolor=#fefefe
| 162720 ||  || — || October 31, 2000 || Socorro || LINEAR || — || align=right | 1.9 km || 
|-id=721 bgcolor=#fefefe
| 162721 ||  || — || October 24, 2000 || Socorro || LINEAR || NYS || align=right | 1.3 km || 
|-id=722 bgcolor=#fefefe
| 162722 || 2000 VD || — || November 1, 2000 || High Point || D. K. Chesney || ERI || align=right | 3.3 km || 
|-id=723 bgcolor=#FFC2E0
| 162723 ||  || — || November 1, 2000 || Socorro || LINEAR || APO +1km || align=right | 1.0 km || 
|-id=724 bgcolor=#fefefe
| 162724 ||  || — || November 1, 2000 || Desert Beaver || W. K. Y. Yeung || NYS || align=right | 1.3 km || 
|-id=725 bgcolor=#fefefe
| 162725 ||  || — || November 1, 2000 || Socorro || LINEAR || — || align=right | 1.5 km || 
|-id=726 bgcolor=#fefefe
| 162726 ||  || — || November 1, 2000 || Socorro || LINEAR || NYS || align=right | 1.3 km || 
|-id=727 bgcolor=#fefefe
| 162727 ||  || — || November 1, 2000 || Socorro || LINEAR || NYS || align=right | 1.2 km || 
|-id=728 bgcolor=#fefefe
| 162728 ||  || — || November 1, 2000 || Socorro || LINEAR || — || align=right | 2.9 km || 
|-id=729 bgcolor=#fefefe
| 162729 ||  || — || November 1, 2000 || Socorro || LINEAR || NYS || align=right | 1.0 km || 
|-id=730 bgcolor=#fefefe
| 162730 ||  || — || November 1, 2000 || Socorro || LINEAR || FLO || align=right | 1.3 km || 
|-id=731 bgcolor=#fefefe
| 162731 ||  || — || November 1, 2000 || Socorro || LINEAR || — || align=right | 1.7 km || 
|-id=732 bgcolor=#fefefe
| 162732 ||  || — || November 1, 2000 || Socorro || LINEAR || NYS || align=right | 1.0 km || 
|-id=733 bgcolor=#fefefe
| 162733 ||  || — || November 1, 2000 || Socorro || LINEAR || ERI || align=right | 4.5 km || 
|-id=734 bgcolor=#fefefe
| 162734 ||  || — || November 2, 2000 || Socorro || LINEAR || NYS || align=right | 1.4 km || 
|-id=735 bgcolor=#fefefe
| 162735 ||  || — || November 2, 2000 || Socorro || LINEAR || NYS || align=right | 1.0 km || 
|-id=736 bgcolor=#fefefe
| 162736 ||  || — || November 3, 2000 || Socorro || LINEAR || — || align=right | 1.6 km || 
|-id=737 bgcolor=#fefefe
| 162737 ||  || — || November 3, 2000 || Socorro || LINEAR || V || align=right | 1.2 km || 
|-id=738 bgcolor=#fefefe
| 162738 ||  || — || November 3, 2000 || Socorro || LINEAR || NYS || align=right data-sort-value="0.90" | 900 m || 
|-id=739 bgcolor=#E9E9E9
| 162739 || 2000 WS || — || November 16, 2000 || Socorro || LINEAR || — || align=right | 3.4 km || 
|-id=740 bgcolor=#FFC2E0
| 162740 ||  || — || November 16, 2000 || Socorro || LINEAR || AMOcritical || align=right data-sort-value="0.74" | 740 m || 
|-id=741 bgcolor=#FFC2E0
| 162741 ||  || — || November 18, 2000 || Socorro || LINEAR || AMO +1km || align=right | 3.9 km || 
|-id=742 bgcolor=#fefefe
| 162742 ||  || — || November 20, 2000 || Socorro || LINEAR || — || align=right | 1.4 km || 
|-id=743 bgcolor=#fefefe
| 162743 ||  || — || November 20, 2000 || Socorro || LINEAR || ERI || align=right | 3.3 km || 
|-id=744 bgcolor=#fefefe
| 162744 ||  || — || November 21, 2000 || Socorro || LINEAR || NYS || align=right | 3.1 km || 
|-id=745 bgcolor=#fefefe
| 162745 ||  || — || November 21, 2000 || Socorro || LINEAR || ERI || align=right | 3.8 km || 
|-id=746 bgcolor=#fefefe
| 162746 ||  || — || November 20, 2000 || Socorro || LINEAR || — || align=right | 4.2 km || 
|-id=747 bgcolor=#fefefe
| 162747 ||  || — || November 23, 2000 || Haleakala || NEAT || — || align=right | 1.8 km || 
|-id=748 bgcolor=#fefefe
| 162748 ||  || — || November 20, 2000 || Socorro || LINEAR || V || align=right | 1.5 km || 
|-id=749 bgcolor=#fefefe
| 162749 ||  || — || November 21, 2000 || Socorro || LINEAR || — || align=right | 1.4 km || 
|-id=750 bgcolor=#fefefe
| 162750 ||  || — || November 21, 2000 || Socorro || LINEAR || NYS || align=right data-sort-value="0.97" | 970 m || 
|-id=751 bgcolor=#fefefe
| 162751 ||  || — || November 21, 2000 || Socorro || LINEAR || NYS || align=right | 1.1 km || 
|-id=752 bgcolor=#fefefe
| 162752 ||  || — || November 21, 2000 || Socorro || LINEAR || — || align=right | 1.9 km || 
|-id=753 bgcolor=#E9E9E9
| 162753 ||  || — || November 20, 2000 || Socorro || LINEAR || — || align=right | 3.1 km || 
|-id=754 bgcolor=#fefefe
| 162754 ||  || — || November 21, 2000 || Socorro || LINEAR || V || align=right | 1.4 km || 
|-id=755 bgcolor=#fefefe
| 162755 Spacesora ||  ||  || November 28, 2000 || Kuma Kogen || A. Nakamura || SUL || align=right | 3.5 km || 
|-id=756 bgcolor=#fefefe
| 162756 ||  || — || November 20, 2000 || Socorro || LINEAR || — || align=right | 1.3 km || 
|-id=757 bgcolor=#fefefe
| 162757 ||  || — || November 20, 2000 || Socorro || LINEAR || — || align=right | 1.4 km || 
|-id=758 bgcolor=#fefefe
| 162758 ||  || — || November 21, 2000 || Socorro || LINEAR || — || align=right | 1.4 km || 
|-id=759 bgcolor=#fefefe
| 162759 ||  || — || November 26, 2000 || Socorro || LINEAR || V || align=right | 1.2 km || 
|-id=760 bgcolor=#fefefe
| 162760 ||  || — || November 20, 2000 || Socorro || LINEAR || ERI || align=right | 2.9 km || 
|-id=761 bgcolor=#fefefe
| 162761 ||  || — || November 20, 2000 || Socorro || LINEAR || ERI || align=right | 2.8 km || 
|-id=762 bgcolor=#fefefe
| 162762 ||  || — || November 20, 2000 || Socorro || LINEAR || — || align=right | 1.7 km || 
|-id=763 bgcolor=#fefefe
| 162763 ||  || — || November 20, 2000 || Socorro || LINEAR || NYS || align=right | 1.3 km || 
|-id=764 bgcolor=#fefefe
| 162764 ||  || — || November 20, 2000 || Socorro || LINEAR || — || align=right | 1.8 km || 
|-id=765 bgcolor=#fefefe
| 162765 ||  || — || November 20, 2000 || Socorro || LINEAR || — || align=right | 1.7 km || 
|-id=766 bgcolor=#fefefe
| 162766 ||  || — || November 17, 2000 || Kitt Peak || Spacewatch || NYS || align=right | 1.2 km || 
|-id=767 bgcolor=#fefefe
| 162767 ||  || — || November 19, 2000 || Socorro || LINEAR || — || align=right | 3.8 km || 
|-id=768 bgcolor=#fefefe
| 162768 ||  || — || November 21, 2000 || Socorro || LINEAR || MAS || align=right | 1.4 km || 
|-id=769 bgcolor=#fefefe
| 162769 ||  || — || November 30, 2000 || Socorro || LINEAR || V || align=right | 2.0 km || 
|-id=770 bgcolor=#fefefe
| 162770 ||  || — || November 30, 2000 || Socorro || LINEAR || V || align=right | 1.2 km || 
|-id=771 bgcolor=#fefefe
| 162771 ||  || — || November 26, 2000 || Socorro || LINEAR || V || align=right | 1.2 km || 
|-id=772 bgcolor=#fefefe
| 162772 ||  || — || November 26, 2000 || Anderson Mesa || LONEOS || slow || align=right | 4.4 km || 
|-id=773 bgcolor=#fefefe
| 162773 ||  || — || November 19, 2000 || Anderson Mesa || LONEOS || V || align=right | 1.1 km || 
|-id=774 bgcolor=#fefefe
| 162774 ||  || — || December 3, 2000 || Kitt Peak || Spacewatch || — || align=right | 1.8 km || 
|-id=775 bgcolor=#fefefe
| 162775 ||  || — || December 1, 2000 || Socorro || LINEAR || V || align=right | 1.5 km || 
|-id=776 bgcolor=#fefefe
| 162776 ||  || — || December 4, 2000 || Socorro || LINEAR || — || align=right | 1.6 km || 
|-id=777 bgcolor=#d6d6d6
| 162777 ||  || — || December 4, 2000 || Socorro || LINEAR || 3:2 || align=right | 9.5 km || 
|-id=778 bgcolor=#fefefe
| 162778 ||  || — || December 4, 2000 || Socorro || LINEAR || — || align=right | 1.7 km || 
|-id=779 bgcolor=#fefefe
| 162779 ||  || — || December 4, 2000 || Socorro || LINEAR || KLI || align=right | 4.6 km || 
|-id=780 bgcolor=#FA8072
| 162780 ||  || — || December 5, 2000 || Socorro || LINEAR || PHO || align=right | 2.3 km || 
|-id=781 bgcolor=#FFC2E0
| 162781 ||  || — || December 6, 2000 || Socorro || LINEAR || AMO +1km || align=right data-sort-value="0.98" | 980 m || 
|-id=782 bgcolor=#fefefe
| 162782 ||  || — || December 4, 2000 || Socorro || LINEAR || — || align=right | 1.6 km || 
|-id=783 bgcolor=#FFC2E0
| 162783 ||  || — || December 19, 2000 || Socorro || LINEAR || APOPHA || align=right data-sort-value="0.26" | 260 m || 
|-id=784 bgcolor=#fefefe
| 162784 ||  || — || December 22, 2000 || Anderson Mesa || LONEOS || — || align=right | 1.8 km || 
|-id=785 bgcolor=#FA8072
| 162785 ||  || — || December 22, 2000 || Socorro || LINEAR || PHO || align=right | 1.9 km || 
|-id=786 bgcolor=#fefefe
| 162786 ||  || — || December 24, 2000 || Anderson Mesa || LONEOS || — || align=right | 3.3 km || 
|-id=787 bgcolor=#E9E9E9
| 162787 ||  || — || December 29, 2000 || Desert Beaver || W. K. Y. Yeung || — || align=right | 5.3 km || 
|-id=788 bgcolor=#E9E9E9
| 162788 ||  || — || December 31, 2000 || Kitt Peak || Spacewatch || — || align=right | 2.2 km || 
|-id=789 bgcolor=#FA8072
| 162789 ||  || — || December 30, 2000 || Socorro || LINEAR || — || align=right | 1.9 km || 
|-id=790 bgcolor=#fefefe
| 162790 ||  || — || December 30, 2000 || Socorro || LINEAR || ERI || align=right | 2.8 km || 
|-id=791 bgcolor=#fefefe
| 162791 ||  || — || December 30, 2000 || Socorro || LINEAR || NYS || align=right | 1.2 km || 
|-id=792 bgcolor=#fefefe
| 162792 ||  || — || December 30, 2000 || Socorro || LINEAR || NYS || align=right | 1.3 km || 
|-id=793 bgcolor=#FA8072
| 162793 ||  || — || December 30, 2000 || Socorro || LINEAR || — || align=right | 1.5 km || 
|-id=794 bgcolor=#fefefe
| 162794 ||  || — || December 30, 2000 || Socorro || LINEAR || MAS || align=right | 1.3 km || 
|-id=795 bgcolor=#fefefe
| 162795 ||  || — || December 30, 2000 || Socorro || LINEAR || ERI || align=right | 3.8 km || 
|-id=796 bgcolor=#d6d6d6
| 162796 ||  || — || December 30, 2000 || Socorro || LINEAR || HIL3:2 || align=right | 11 km || 
|-id=797 bgcolor=#fefefe
| 162797 ||  || — || December 30, 2000 || Socorro || LINEAR || NYS || align=right | 1.4 km || 
|-id=798 bgcolor=#fefefe
| 162798 ||  || — || December 30, 2000 || Socorro || LINEAR || NYS || align=right | 1.3 km || 
|-id=799 bgcolor=#fefefe
| 162799 ||  || — || December 30, 2000 || Socorro || LINEAR || NYS || align=right | 1.4 km || 
|-id=800 bgcolor=#fefefe
| 162800 ||  || — || December 30, 2000 || Socorro || LINEAR || NYS || align=right | 4.4 km || 
|}

162801–162900 

|-bgcolor=#fefefe
| 162801 ||  || — || December 30, 2000 || Socorro || LINEAR || NYS || align=right | 1.6 km || 
|-id=802 bgcolor=#fefefe
| 162802 ||  || — || December 19, 2000 || Socorro || LINEAR || — || align=right | 2.0 km || 
|-id=803 bgcolor=#fefefe
| 162803 ||  || — || December 30, 2000 || Anderson Mesa || LONEOS || — || align=right | 1.8 km || 
|-id=804 bgcolor=#E9E9E9
| 162804 ||  || — || December 23, 2000 || Anderson Mesa || LONEOS || EUN || align=right | 2.2 km || 
|-id=805 bgcolor=#C2FFFF
| 162805 || 2001 AR || — || January 2, 2001 || Oizumi || T. Kobayashi || L4 || align=right | 19 km || 
|-id=806 bgcolor=#fefefe
| 162806 ||  || — || January 2, 2001 || Socorro || LINEAR || V || align=right | 1.5 km || 
|-id=807 bgcolor=#fefefe
| 162807 ||  || — || January 2, 2001 || Socorro || LINEAR || — || align=right | 2.0 km || 
|-id=808 bgcolor=#fefefe
| 162808 ||  || — || January 2, 2001 || Socorro || LINEAR || — || align=right | 3.6 km || 
|-id=809 bgcolor=#E9E9E9
| 162809 ||  || — || January 4, 2001 || Socorro || LINEAR || — || align=right | 2.1 km || 
|-id=810 bgcolor=#fefefe
| 162810 ||  || — || January 5, 2001 || Socorro || LINEAR || — || align=right | 2.2 km || 
|-id=811 bgcolor=#C2FFFF
| 162811 ||  || — || January 15, 2001 || Kitt Peak || Spacewatch || L4 || align=right | 14 km || 
|-id=812 bgcolor=#fefefe
| 162812 ||  || — || January 15, 2001 || Kitt Peak || Spacewatch || — || align=right | 1.6 km || 
|-id=813 bgcolor=#fefefe
| 162813 ||  || — || January 19, 2001 || Socorro || LINEAR || — || align=right | 3.1 km || 
|-id=814 bgcolor=#fefefe
| 162814 ||  || — || January 19, 2001 || Socorro || LINEAR || — || align=right | 1.7 km || 
|-id=815 bgcolor=#fefefe
| 162815 ||  || — || January 20, 2001 || Socorro || LINEAR || EUT || align=right | 1.2 km || 
|-id=816 bgcolor=#fefefe
| 162816 ||  || — || January 20, 2001 || Socorro || LINEAR || — || align=right | 1.5 km || 
|-id=817 bgcolor=#fefefe
| 162817 ||  || — || January 20, 2001 || Socorro || LINEAR || — || align=right | 1.8 km || 
|-id=818 bgcolor=#fefefe
| 162818 ||  || — || January 20, 2001 || Socorro || LINEAR || — || align=right | 2.0 km || 
|-id=819 bgcolor=#FA8072
| 162819 ||  || — || January 20, 2001 || Socorro || LINEAR || PHO || align=right | 2.4 km || 
|-id=820 bgcolor=#E9E9E9
| 162820 ||  || — || January 19, 2001 || Socorro || LINEAR || ADE || align=right | 4.9 km || 
|-id=821 bgcolor=#E9E9E9
| 162821 ||  || — || January 19, 2001 || Socorro || LINEAR || — || align=right | 2.8 km || 
|-id=822 bgcolor=#C2FFFF
| 162822 ||  || — || January 21, 2001 || Socorro || LINEAR || L4 || align=right | 18 km || 
|-id=823 bgcolor=#E9E9E9
| 162823 ||  || — || January 21, 2001 || Socorro || LINEAR || AER || align=right | 4.1 km || 
|-id=824 bgcolor=#fefefe
| 162824 ||  || — || January 29, 2001 || Oizumi || T. Kobayashi || H || align=right | 1.8 km || 
|-id=825 bgcolor=#FFC2E0
| 162825 ||  || — || January 26, 2001 || Socorro || LINEAR || APO +1kmPHA || align=right data-sort-value="0.88" | 880 m || 
|-id=826 bgcolor=#E9E9E9
| 162826 ||  || — || January 29, 2001 || Socorro || LINEAR || — || align=right | 4.9 km || 
|-id=827 bgcolor=#fefefe
| 162827 ||  || — || January 26, 2001 || Kitt Peak || Spacewatch || — || align=right | 1.8 km || 
|-id=828 bgcolor=#fefefe
| 162828 || 2001 CG || — || February 1, 2001 || Višnjan Observatory || K. Korlević || — || align=right | 2.3 km || 
|-id=829 bgcolor=#E9E9E9
| 162829 ||  || — || February 1, 2001 || Socorro || LINEAR || — || align=right | 4.1 km || 
|-id=830 bgcolor=#fefefe
| 162830 ||  || — || February 1, 2001 || Socorro || LINEAR || NYS || align=right | 1.8 km || 
|-id=831 bgcolor=#E9E9E9
| 162831 ||  || — || February 1, 2001 || Socorro || LINEAR || — || align=right | 2.4 km || 
|-id=832 bgcolor=#fefefe
| 162832 ||  || — || February 1, 2001 || Socorro || LINEAR || MAS || align=right | 1.7 km || 
|-id=833 bgcolor=#E9E9E9
| 162833 ||  || — || February 1, 2001 || Socorro || LINEAR || HNS || align=right | 1.9 km || 
|-id=834 bgcolor=#E9E9E9
| 162834 ||  || — || February 1, 2001 || Socorro || LINEAR || — || align=right | 2.3 km || 
|-id=835 bgcolor=#E9E9E9
| 162835 ||  || — || February 2, 2001 || Socorro || LINEAR || XIZ || align=right | 3.0 km || 
|-id=836 bgcolor=#E9E9E9
| 162836 ||  || — || February 1, 2001 || Anderson Mesa || LONEOS || — || align=right | 3.4 km || 
|-id=837 bgcolor=#E9E9E9
| 162837 ||  || — || February 2, 2001 || Anderson Mesa || LONEOS || — || align=right | 3.4 km || 
|-id=838 bgcolor=#E9E9E9
| 162838 ||  || — || February 15, 2001 || Oizumi || T. Kobayashi || — || align=right | 2.7 km || 
|-id=839 bgcolor=#E9E9E9
| 162839 ||  || — || February 13, 2001 || Kitt Peak || Spacewatch || EUN || align=right | 1.8 km || 
|-id=840 bgcolor=#fefefe
| 162840 ||  || — || February 16, 2001 || Socorro || LINEAR || H || align=right data-sort-value="0.86" | 860 m || 
|-id=841 bgcolor=#E9E9E9
| 162841 ||  || — || February 16, 2001 || Socorro || LINEAR || — || align=right | 2.3 km || 
|-id=842 bgcolor=#E9E9E9
| 162842 ||  || — || February 16, 2001 || Oizumi || T. Kobayashi || — || align=right | 2.1 km || 
|-id=843 bgcolor=#E9E9E9
| 162843 ||  || — || February 19, 2001 || Oizumi || T. Kobayashi || — || align=right | 3.9 km || 
|-id=844 bgcolor=#E9E9E9
| 162844 ||  || — || February 17, 2001 || Socorro || LINEAR || HNS || align=right | 1.7 km || 
|-id=845 bgcolor=#E9E9E9
| 162845 ||  || — || February 17, 2001 || Socorro || LINEAR || — || align=right | 2.5 km || 
|-id=846 bgcolor=#fefefe
| 162846 ||  || — || February 17, 2001 || Socorro || LINEAR || — || align=right | 1.5 km || 
|-id=847 bgcolor=#E9E9E9
| 162847 ||  || — || February 17, 2001 || Socorro || LINEAR || — || align=right | 3.5 km || 
|-id=848 bgcolor=#E9E9E9
| 162848 ||  || — || February 17, 2001 || Socorro || LINEAR || — || align=right | 3.9 km || 
|-id=849 bgcolor=#fefefe
| 162849 ||  || — || February 17, 2001 || Socorro || LINEAR || — || align=right | 1.5 km || 
|-id=850 bgcolor=#fefefe
| 162850 ||  || — || February 19, 2001 || Socorro || LINEAR || — || align=right | 1.9 km || 
|-id=851 bgcolor=#C2FFFF
| 162851 ||  || — || February 19, 2001 || Socorro || LINEAR || L4 || align=right | 14 km || 
|-id=852 bgcolor=#E9E9E9
| 162852 ||  || — || February 19, 2001 || Socorro || LINEAR || — || align=right | 2.8 km || 
|-id=853 bgcolor=#E9E9E9
| 162853 ||  || — || February 19, 2001 || Socorro || LINEAR || — || align=right | 1.9 km || 
|-id=854 bgcolor=#FFC2E0
| 162854 ||  || — || February 19, 2001 || Socorro || LINEAR || AMO || align=right data-sort-value="0.57" | 570 m || 
|-id=855 bgcolor=#E9E9E9
| 162855 ||  || — || February 16, 2001 || Socorro || LINEAR || — || align=right | 2.1 km || 
|-id=856 bgcolor=#d6d6d6
| 162856 ||  || — || February 20, 2001 || Socorro || LINEAR || — || align=right | 6.6 km || 
|-id=857 bgcolor=#E9E9E9
| 162857 ||  || — || February 19, 2001 || Socorro || LINEAR || — || align=right | 3.1 km || 
|-id=858 bgcolor=#E9E9E9
| 162858 ||  || — || February 19, 2001 || Socorro || LINEAR || — || align=right | 3.2 km || 
|-id=859 bgcolor=#E9E9E9
| 162859 ||  || — || February 21, 2001 || Socorro || LINEAR || — || align=right | 1.6 km || 
|-id=860 bgcolor=#E9E9E9
| 162860 ||  || — || February 16, 2001 || Socorro || LINEAR || MAR || align=right | 1.6 km || 
|-id=861 bgcolor=#C2FFFF
| 162861 ||  || — || February 16, 2001 || Anderson Mesa || LONEOS || L4 || align=right | 23 km || 
|-id=862 bgcolor=#E9E9E9
| 162862 ||  || — || February 16, 2001 || Anderson Mesa || LONEOS || — || align=right | 1.6 km || 
|-id=863 bgcolor=#E9E9E9
| 162863 ||  || — || March 2, 2001 || Anderson Mesa || LONEOS || GEF || align=right | 2.4 km || 
|-id=864 bgcolor=#E9E9E9
| 162864 ||  || — || March 2, 2001 || Anderson Mesa || LONEOS || — || align=right | 2.4 km || 
|-id=865 bgcolor=#E9E9E9
| 162865 ||  || — || March 2, 2001 || Anderson Mesa || LONEOS || — || align=right | 2.3 km || 
|-id=866 bgcolor=#fefefe
| 162866 ||  || — || March 4, 2001 || Socorro || LINEAR || H || align=right | 1.1 km || 
|-id=867 bgcolor=#E9E9E9
| 162867 ||  || — || March 14, 2001 || Kitt Peak || Spacewatch || — || align=right | 2.5 km || 
|-id=868 bgcolor=#E9E9E9
| 162868 ||  || — || March 15, 2001 || Kitt Peak || Spacewatch || MAR || align=right | 2.2 km || 
|-id=869 bgcolor=#E9E9E9
| 162869 ||  || — || March 15, 2001 || Anderson Mesa || LONEOS || NEM || align=right | 2.9 km || 
|-id=870 bgcolor=#E9E9E9
| 162870 ||  || — || March 15, 2001 || Haleakala || NEAT || — || align=right | 4.0 km || 
|-id=871 bgcolor=#E9E9E9
| 162871 ||  || — || March 2, 2001 || Anderson Mesa || LONEOS || — || align=right | 2.6 km || 
|-id=872 bgcolor=#E9E9E9
| 162872 ||  || — || March 18, 2001 || Socorro || LINEAR || GEF || align=right | 2.6 km || 
|-id=873 bgcolor=#FFC2E0
| 162873 ||  || — || March 18, 2001 || Socorro || LINEAR || AMO || align=right data-sort-value="0.56" | 560 m || 
|-id=874 bgcolor=#E9E9E9
| 162874 ||  || — || March 19, 2001 || Anderson Mesa || LONEOS || MAR || align=right | 1.6 km || 
|-id=875 bgcolor=#E9E9E9
| 162875 ||  || — || March 19, 2001 || Anderson Mesa || LONEOS || GEF || align=right | 2.9 km || 
|-id=876 bgcolor=#fefefe
| 162876 ||  || — || March 19, 2001 || Socorro || LINEAR || H || align=right | 1.3 km || 
|-id=877 bgcolor=#d6d6d6
| 162877 ||  || — || March 19, 2001 || Socorro || LINEAR || — || align=right | 4.9 km || 
|-id=878 bgcolor=#E9E9E9
| 162878 ||  || — || March 18, 2001 || Socorro || LINEAR || — || align=right | 3.6 km || 
|-id=879 bgcolor=#E9E9E9
| 162879 ||  || — || March 18, 2001 || Socorro || LINEAR || GEF || align=right | 1.9 km || 
|-id=880 bgcolor=#E9E9E9
| 162880 ||  || — || March 18, 2001 || Socorro || LINEAR || EUN || align=right | 2.1 km || 
|-id=881 bgcolor=#E9E9E9
| 162881 ||  || — || March 18, 2001 || Socorro || LINEAR || — || align=right | 3.6 km || 
|-id=882 bgcolor=#FFC2E0
| 162882 ||  || — || March 24, 2001 || Socorro || LINEAR || APOPHA || align=right data-sort-value="0.64" | 640 m || 
|-id=883 bgcolor=#d6d6d6
| 162883 ||  || — || March 19, 2001 || Socorro || LINEAR || — || align=right | 5.4 km || 
|-id=884 bgcolor=#E9E9E9
| 162884 ||  || — || March 19, 2001 || Socorro || LINEAR || — || align=right | 1.6 km || 
|-id=885 bgcolor=#E9E9E9
| 162885 ||  || — || March 26, 2001 || Kitt Peak || Spacewatch || — || align=right | 2.0 km || 
|-id=886 bgcolor=#E9E9E9
| 162886 ||  || — || March 26, 2001 || Kitt Peak || Spacewatch || AGN || align=right | 1.6 km || 
|-id=887 bgcolor=#E9E9E9
| 162887 ||  || — || March 16, 2001 || Socorro || LINEAR || — || align=right | 2.3 km || 
|-id=888 bgcolor=#E9E9E9
| 162888 ||  || — || March 18, 2001 || Anderson Mesa || LONEOS || GAL || align=right | 2.9 km || 
|-id=889 bgcolor=#E9E9E9
| 162889 ||  || — || March 19, 2001 || Socorro || LINEAR || — || align=right | 1.8 km || 
|-id=890 bgcolor=#E9E9E9
| 162890 ||  || — || March 21, 2001 || Haleakala || NEAT || HEN || align=right | 1.5 km || 
|-id=891 bgcolor=#E9E9E9
| 162891 ||  || — || March 23, 2001 || Cima Ekar || ADAS || — || align=right | 1.9 km || 
|-id=892 bgcolor=#E9E9E9
| 162892 ||  || — || April 13, 2001 || Kitt Peak || Spacewatch || WIT || align=right | 1.9 km || 
|-id=893 bgcolor=#fefefe
| 162893 ||  || — || April 14, 2001 || Socorro || LINEAR || H || align=right | 1.2 km || 
|-id=894 bgcolor=#E9E9E9
| 162894 || 2001 HD || — || April 16, 2001 || Kitt Peak || Spacewatch || — || align=right | 4.5 km || 
|-id=895 bgcolor=#E9E9E9
| 162895 ||  || — || April 16, 2001 || Socorro || LINEAR || — || align=right | 3.3 km || 
|-id=896 bgcolor=#d6d6d6
| 162896 ||  || — || April 18, 2001 || Socorro || LINEAR || — || align=right | 5.2 km || 
|-id=897 bgcolor=#E9E9E9
| 162897 ||  || — || April 23, 2001 || Kitt Peak || Spacewatch || — || align=right | 3.3 km || 
|-id=898 bgcolor=#fefefe
| 162898 ||  || — || April 24, 2001 || Haleakala || NEAT || H || align=right | 1.3 km || 
|-id=899 bgcolor=#E9E9E9
| 162899 ||  || — || April 27, 2001 || Desert Beaver || W. K. Y. Yeung || — || align=right | 2.5 km || 
|-id=900 bgcolor=#FFC2E0
| 162900 ||  || — || April 24, 2001 || Haleakala || NEAT || AMO +1km || align=right | 2.5 km || 
|}

162901–163000 

|-bgcolor=#fefefe
| 162901 ||  || — || April 17, 2001 || Anderson Mesa || LONEOS || NYS || align=right | 1.2 km || 
|-id=902 bgcolor=#fefefe
| 162902 ||  || — || April 26, 2001 || Anderson Mesa || LONEOS || H || align=right | 1.3 km || 
|-id=903 bgcolor=#FFC2E0
| 162903 ||  || — || May 15, 2001 || Socorro || LINEAR || APOcritical || align=right | 1.1 km || 
|-id=904 bgcolor=#d6d6d6
| 162904 ||  || — || May 15, 2001 || Kitt Peak || Spacewatch || — || align=right | 4.5 km || 
|-id=905 bgcolor=#E9E9E9
| 162905 ||  || — || May 17, 2001 || Socorro || LINEAR || — || align=right | 2.7 km || 
|-id=906 bgcolor=#d6d6d6
| 162906 ||  || — || May 18, 2001 || Socorro || LINEAR || — || align=right | 5.8 km || 
|-id=907 bgcolor=#fefefe
| 162907 ||  || — || May 23, 2001 || Socorro || LINEAR || H || align=right | 1.1 km || 
|-id=908 bgcolor=#d6d6d6
| 162908 ||  || — || May 22, 2001 || Socorro || LINEAR || — || align=right | 5.3 km || 
|-id=909 bgcolor=#E9E9E9
| 162909 ||  || — || May 24, 2001 || Prescott || P. G. Comba || — || align=right | 4.7 km || 
|-id=910 bgcolor=#d6d6d6
| 162910 ||  || — || May 18, 2001 || Anderson Mesa || LONEOS || — || align=right | 5.1 km || 
|-id=911 bgcolor=#FFC2E0
| 162911 ||  || — || June 6, 2001 || Palomar || NEAT || APO || align=right data-sort-value="0.51" | 510 m || 
|-id=912 bgcolor=#d6d6d6
| 162912 ||  || — || June 21, 2001 || Palomar || NEAT || — || align=right | 7.2 km || 
|-id=913 bgcolor=#FFC2E0
| 162913 ||  || — || June 28, 2001 || Anderson Mesa || LONEOS || APO || align=right data-sort-value="0.76" | 760 m || 
|-id=914 bgcolor=#d6d6d6
| 162914 ||  || — || July 13, 2001 || Palomar || NEAT || — || align=right | 9.5 km || 
|-id=915 bgcolor=#d6d6d6
| 162915 ||  || — || July 14, 2001 || Palomar || NEAT || HYG || align=right | 4.1 km || 
|-id=916 bgcolor=#d6d6d6
| 162916 ||  || — || July 13, 2001 || Palomar || NEAT || EUP || align=right | 7.7 km || 
|-id=917 bgcolor=#d6d6d6
| 162917 ||  || — || July 18, 2001 || Palomar || NEAT || — || align=right | 6.9 km || 
|-id=918 bgcolor=#d6d6d6
| 162918 ||  || — || July 17, 2001 || Anderson Mesa || LONEOS || — || align=right | 8.7 km || 
|-id=919 bgcolor=#d6d6d6
| 162919 ||  || — || July 17, 2001 || Anderson Mesa || LONEOS || — || align=right | 6.8 km || 
|-id=920 bgcolor=#d6d6d6
| 162920 ||  || — || July 20, 2001 || Anderson Mesa || LONEOS || — || align=right | 7.4 km || 
|-id=921 bgcolor=#d6d6d6
| 162921 ||  || — || July 17, 2001 || Palomar || NEAT || slow || align=right | 6.9 km || 
|-id=922 bgcolor=#FFC2E0
| 162922 ||  || — || July 19, 2001 || Anderson Mesa || LONEOS || APOPHAcritical || align=right data-sort-value="0.25" | 250 m || 
|-id=923 bgcolor=#d6d6d6
| 162923 ||  || — || July 16, 2001 || Anderson Mesa || LONEOS || ALA || align=right | 7.1 km || 
|-id=924 bgcolor=#d6d6d6
| 162924 ||  || — || July 18, 2001 || Palomar || NEAT || — || align=right | 5.4 km || 
|-id=925 bgcolor=#d6d6d6
| 162925 ||  || — || July 19, 2001 || Palomar || NEAT || — || align=right | 8.9 km || 
|-id=926 bgcolor=#FFC2E0
| 162926 ||  || — || July 24, 2001 || Palomar || NEAT || AMO +1kmcritical || align=right | 1.5 km || 
|-id=927 bgcolor=#d6d6d6
| 162927 ||  || — || July 17, 2001 || Anderson Mesa || LONEOS || THB || align=right | 5.0 km || 
|-id=928 bgcolor=#d6d6d6
| 162928 ||  || — || July 22, 2001 || Palomar || NEAT || — || align=right | 5.1 km || 
|-id=929 bgcolor=#d6d6d6
| 162929 ||  || — || July 30, 2001 || Palomar || NEAT || — || align=right | 5.1 km || 
|-id=930 bgcolor=#d6d6d6
| 162930 ||  || — || July 26, 2001 || Haleakala || NEAT || — || align=right | 8.6 km || 
|-id=931 bgcolor=#d6d6d6
| 162931 ||  || — || July 27, 2001 || Palomar || NEAT || THM || align=right | 3.8 km || 
|-id=932 bgcolor=#d6d6d6
| 162932 ||  || — || July 18, 2001 || Kitt Peak || Spacewatch || — || align=right | 6.8 km || 
|-id=933 bgcolor=#d6d6d6
| 162933 ||  || — || July 21, 2001 || Haleakala || NEAT || — || align=right | 4.5 km || 
|-id=934 bgcolor=#d6d6d6
| 162934 ||  || — || July 24, 2001 || Palomar || NEAT || ALA || align=right | 6.9 km || 
|-id=935 bgcolor=#d6d6d6
| 162935 ||  || — || July 26, 2001 || Palomar || NEAT || LIX || align=right | 6.5 km || 
|-id=936 bgcolor=#d6d6d6
| 162936 ||  || — || July 28, 2001 || Haleakala || NEAT || — || align=right | 8.4 km || 
|-id=937 bgcolor=#d6d6d6
| 162937 Prêtre ||  ||  || August 12, 2001 || Vicques || M. Ory || — || align=right | 3.7 km || 
|-id=938 bgcolor=#d6d6d6
| 162938 ||  || — || August 8, 2001 || Haleakala || NEAT || HYG || align=right | 4.6 km || 
|-id=939 bgcolor=#d6d6d6
| 162939 ||  || — || August 11, 2001 || Palomar || NEAT || LIX || align=right | 7.7 km || 
|-id=940 bgcolor=#d6d6d6
| 162940 ||  || — || August 10, 2001 || Haleakala || NEAT || EOS || align=right | 6.9 km || 
|-id=941 bgcolor=#d6d6d6
| 162941 ||  || — || August 11, 2001 || Haleakala || NEAT || EUP || align=right | 6.1 km || 
|-id=942 bgcolor=#d6d6d6
| 162942 ||  || — || August 13, 2001 || Haleakala || NEAT || — || align=right | 7.4 km || 
|-id=943 bgcolor=#d6d6d6
| 162943 ||  || — || August 16, 2001 || Socorro || LINEAR || — || align=right | 6.0 km || 
|-id=944 bgcolor=#d6d6d6
| 162944 ||  || — || August 16, 2001 || Socorro || LINEAR || — || align=right | 6.4 km || 
|-id=945 bgcolor=#d6d6d6
| 162945 ||  || — || August 16, 2001 || Socorro || LINEAR || HYG || align=right | 5.5 km || 
|-id=946 bgcolor=#d6d6d6
| 162946 ||  || — || August 16, 2001 || Socorro || LINEAR || — || align=right | 7.6 km || 
|-id=947 bgcolor=#d6d6d6
| 162947 ||  || — || August 16, 2001 || Socorro || LINEAR || — || align=right | 5.4 km || 
|-id=948 bgcolor=#d6d6d6
| 162948 ||  || — || August 16, 2001 || Socorro || LINEAR || THM || align=right | 6.0 km || 
|-id=949 bgcolor=#d6d6d6
| 162949 ||  || — || August 16, 2001 || Socorro || LINEAR || — || align=right | 5.8 km || 
|-id=950 bgcolor=#d6d6d6
| 162950 ||  || — || August 16, 2001 || Socorro || LINEAR || — || align=right | 5.9 km || 
|-id=951 bgcolor=#d6d6d6
| 162951 ||  || — || August 16, 2001 || Socorro || LINEAR || — || align=right | 5.1 km || 
|-id=952 bgcolor=#d6d6d6
| 162952 ||  || — || August 16, 2001 || Socorro || LINEAR || HYG || align=right | 5.2 km || 
|-id=953 bgcolor=#d6d6d6
| 162953 ||  || — || August 16, 2001 || Socorro || LINEAR || — || align=right | 7.6 km || 
|-id=954 bgcolor=#d6d6d6
| 162954 ||  || — || August 22, 2001 || Socorro || LINEAR || — || align=right | 7.6 km || 
|-id=955 bgcolor=#d6d6d6
| 162955 ||  || — || August 18, 2001 || Anderson Mesa || LONEOS || — || align=right | 7.6 km || 
|-id=956 bgcolor=#d6d6d6
| 162956 ||  || — || August 17, 2001 || Socorro || LINEAR || — || align=right | 5.2 km || 
|-id=957 bgcolor=#d6d6d6
| 162957 ||  || — || August 19, 2001 || Socorro || LINEAR || — || align=right | 5.7 km || 
|-id=958 bgcolor=#d6d6d6
| 162958 ||  || — || August 20, 2001 || Socorro || LINEAR || — || align=right | 5.5 km || 
|-id=959 bgcolor=#d6d6d6
| 162959 ||  || — || August 21, 2001 || Kitt Peak || Spacewatch || — || align=right | 4.4 km || 
|-id=960 bgcolor=#d6d6d6
| 162960 ||  || — || August 23, 2001 || Anderson Mesa || LONEOS || — || align=right | 6.7 km || 
|-id=961 bgcolor=#d6d6d6
| 162961 ||  || — || August 22, 2001 || Haleakala || NEAT || — || align=right | 5.0 km || 
|-id=962 bgcolor=#d6d6d6
| 162962 ||  || — || August 25, 2001 || Socorro || LINEAR || EOS || align=right | 4.6 km || 
|-id=963 bgcolor=#d6d6d6
| 162963 ||  || — || August 25, 2001 || Socorro || LINEAR || — || align=right | 7.7 km || 
|-id=964 bgcolor=#d6d6d6
| 162964 ||  || — || August 23, 2001 || Anderson Mesa || LONEOS || — || align=right | 5.1 km || 
|-id=965 bgcolor=#d6d6d6
| 162965 ||  || — || August 23, 2001 || Anderson Mesa || LONEOS || EOS || align=right | 3.8 km || 
|-id=966 bgcolor=#d6d6d6
| 162966 ||  || — || August 23, 2001 || Anderson Mesa || LONEOS || — || align=right | 4.4 km || 
|-id=967 bgcolor=#d6d6d6
| 162967 ||  || — || August 23, 2001 || Kitt Peak || Spacewatch || — || align=right | 6.1 km || 
|-id=968 bgcolor=#d6d6d6
| 162968 ||  || — || August 24, 2001 || Anderson Mesa || LONEOS || — || align=right | 5.9 km || 
|-id=969 bgcolor=#d6d6d6
| 162969 ||  || — || August 24, 2001 || Socorro || LINEAR || 7:4 || align=right | 5.3 km || 
|-id=970 bgcolor=#d6d6d6
| 162970 ||  || — || August 24, 2001 || Socorro || LINEAR || — || align=right | 5.0 km || 
|-id=971 bgcolor=#d6d6d6
| 162971 ||  || — || August 25, 2001 || Socorro || LINEAR || ALA || align=right | 6.6 km || 
|-id=972 bgcolor=#d6d6d6
| 162972 ||  || — || August 19, 2001 || Socorro || LINEAR || — || align=right | 4.6 km || 
|-id=973 bgcolor=#d6d6d6
| 162973 ||  || — || August 19, 2001 || Socorro || LINEAR || — || align=right | 5.6 km || 
|-id=974 bgcolor=#d6d6d6
| 162974 ||  || — || August 19, 2001 || Socorro || LINEAR || ALA || align=right | 6.8 km || 
|-id=975 bgcolor=#d6d6d6
| 162975 ||  || — || August 19, 2001 || Socorro || LINEAR || — || align=right | 7.0 km || 
|-id=976 bgcolor=#d6d6d6
| 162976 ||  || — || August 17, 2001 || Palomar || NEAT || — || align=right | 9.3 km || 
|-id=977 bgcolor=#d6d6d6
| 162977 ||  || — || August 24, 2001 || Socorro || LINEAR || — || align=right | 5.8 km || 
|-id=978 bgcolor=#d6d6d6
| 162978 Helenhart ||  ||  || August 19, 2001 || Cerro Tololo || M. W. Buie || — || align=right | 5.2 km || 
|-id=979 bgcolor=#FFC2E0
| 162979 ||  || — || September 10, 2001 || Socorro || LINEAR || APO +1kmPHA || align=right data-sort-value="0.81" | 810 m || 
|-id=980 bgcolor=#FFC2E0
| 162980 ||  || — || September 11, 2001 || Socorro || LINEAR || APO +1km || align=right data-sort-value="0.79" | 790 m || 
|-id=981 bgcolor=#d6d6d6
| 162981 ||  || — || September 7, 2001 || Socorro || LINEAR || THM || align=right | 6.1 km || 
|-id=982 bgcolor=#d6d6d6
| 162982 ||  || — || September 10, 2001 || Socorro || LINEAR || — || align=right | 4.4 km || 
|-id=983 bgcolor=#d6d6d6
| 162983 ||  || — || September 12, 2001 || Socorro || LINEAR || — || align=right | 5.7 km || 
|-id=984 bgcolor=#d6d6d6
| 162984 ||  || — || September 12, 2001 || Socorro || LINEAR || — || align=right | 3.5 km || 
|-id=985 bgcolor=#d6d6d6
| 162985 ||  || — || September 12, 2001 || Socorro || LINEAR || HYG || align=right | 4.9 km || 
|-id=986 bgcolor=#d6d6d6
| 162986 ||  || — || September 12, 2001 || Socorro || LINEAR || — || align=right | 5.6 km || 
|-id=987 bgcolor=#d6d6d6
| 162987 ||  || — || September 12, 2001 || Socorro || LINEAR || THM || align=right | 6.4 km || 
|-id=988 bgcolor=#d6d6d6
| 162988 ||  || — || September 12, 2001 || Socorro || LINEAR || EOS || align=right | 6.4 km || 
|-id=989 bgcolor=#d6d6d6
| 162989 ||  || — || September 16, 2001 || Socorro || LINEAR || HYG || align=right | 4.7 km || 
|-id=990 bgcolor=#d6d6d6
| 162990 ||  || — || September 16, 2001 || Socorro || LINEAR || — || align=right | 8.2 km || 
|-id=991 bgcolor=#FA8072
| 162991 ||  || — || September 17, 2001 || Socorro || LINEAR || — || align=right | 1.4 km || 
|-id=992 bgcolor=#d6d6d6
| 162992 ||  || — || September 18, 2001 || Goodricke-Pigott || R. A. Tucker || URS || align=right | 7.1 km || 
|-id=993 bgcolor=#d6d6d6
| 162993 ||  || — || September 20, 2001 || Socorro || LINEAR || — || align=right | 4.7 km || 
|-id=994 bgcolor=#d6d6d6
| 162994 ||  || — || September 20, 2001 || Socorro || LINEAR || CRO || align=right | 5.3 km || 
|-id=995 bgcolor=#fefefe
| 162995 ||  || — || September 20, 2001 || Socorro || LINEAR || — || align=right data-sort-value="0.83" | 830 m || 
|-id=996 bgcolor=#d6d6d6
| 162996 ||  || — || September 20, 2001 || Socorro || LINEAR || HYG || align=right | 3.8 km || 
|-id=997 bgcolor=#d6d6d6
| 162997 ||  || — || September 20, 2001 || Socorro || LINEAR || EUP || align=right | 7.2 km || 
|-id=998 bgcolor=#FFC2E0
| 162998 ||  || — || September 17, 2001 || Socorro || LINEAR || APO +1kmPHA || align=right data-sort-value="0.88" | 880 m || 
|-id=999 bgcolor=#d6d6d6
| 162999 ||  || — || September 19, 2001 || Socorro || LINEAR || — || align=right | 5.5 km || 
|-id=000 bgcolor=#FFC2E0
| 163000 ||  || — || September 19, 2001 || Socorro || LINEAR || AMO || align=right data-sort-value="0.51" | 510 m || 
|}

References

External links 
 Discovery Circumstances: Numbered Minor Planets (160001)–(165000) (IAU Minor Planet Center)

0162